= Rochester, New York =

City in New York, United States

- City
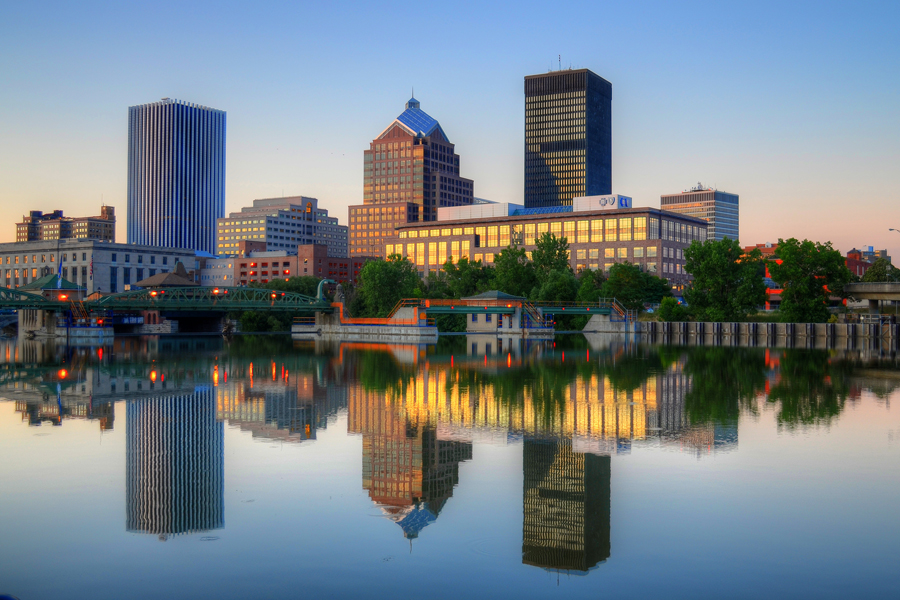
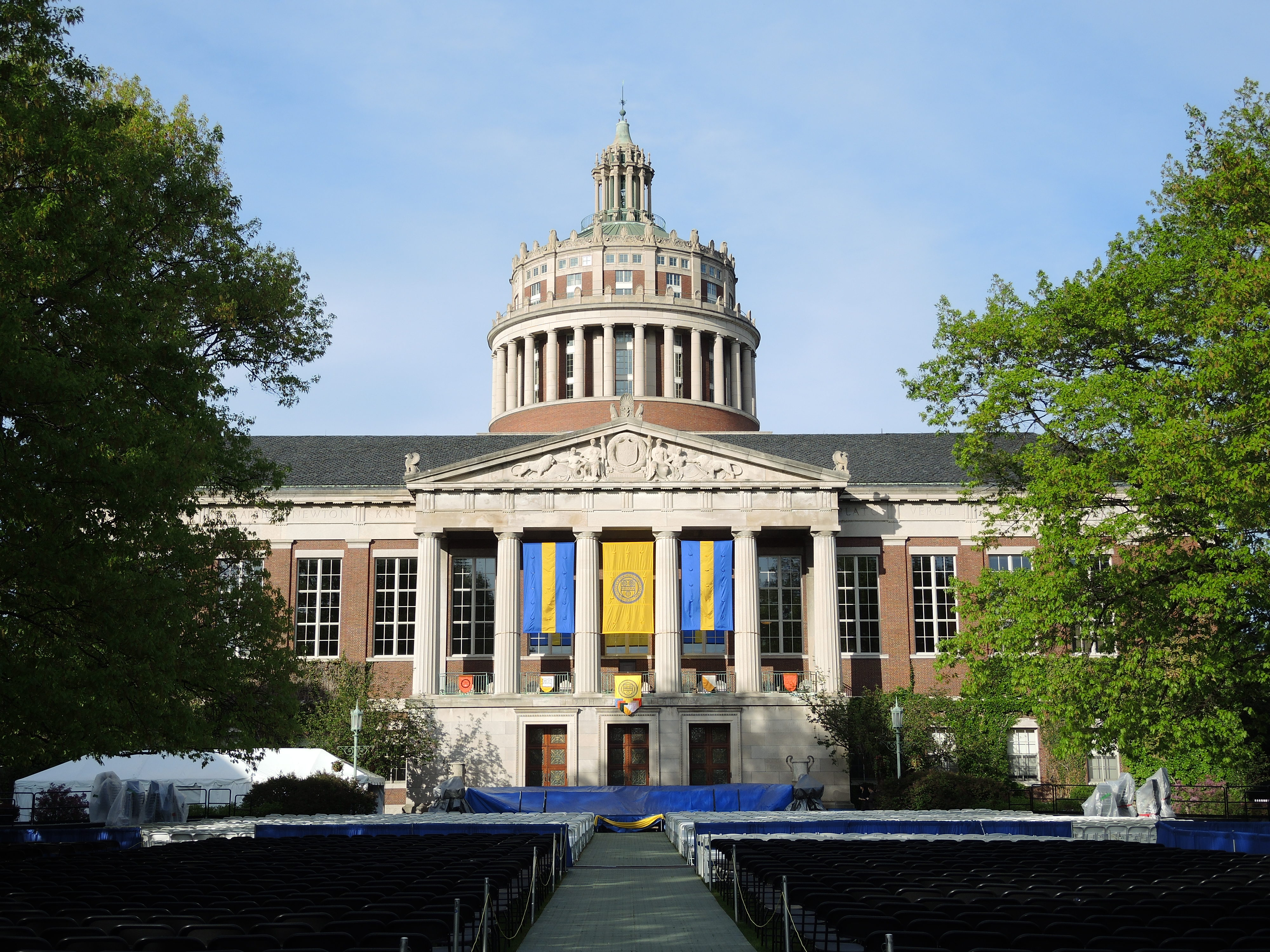
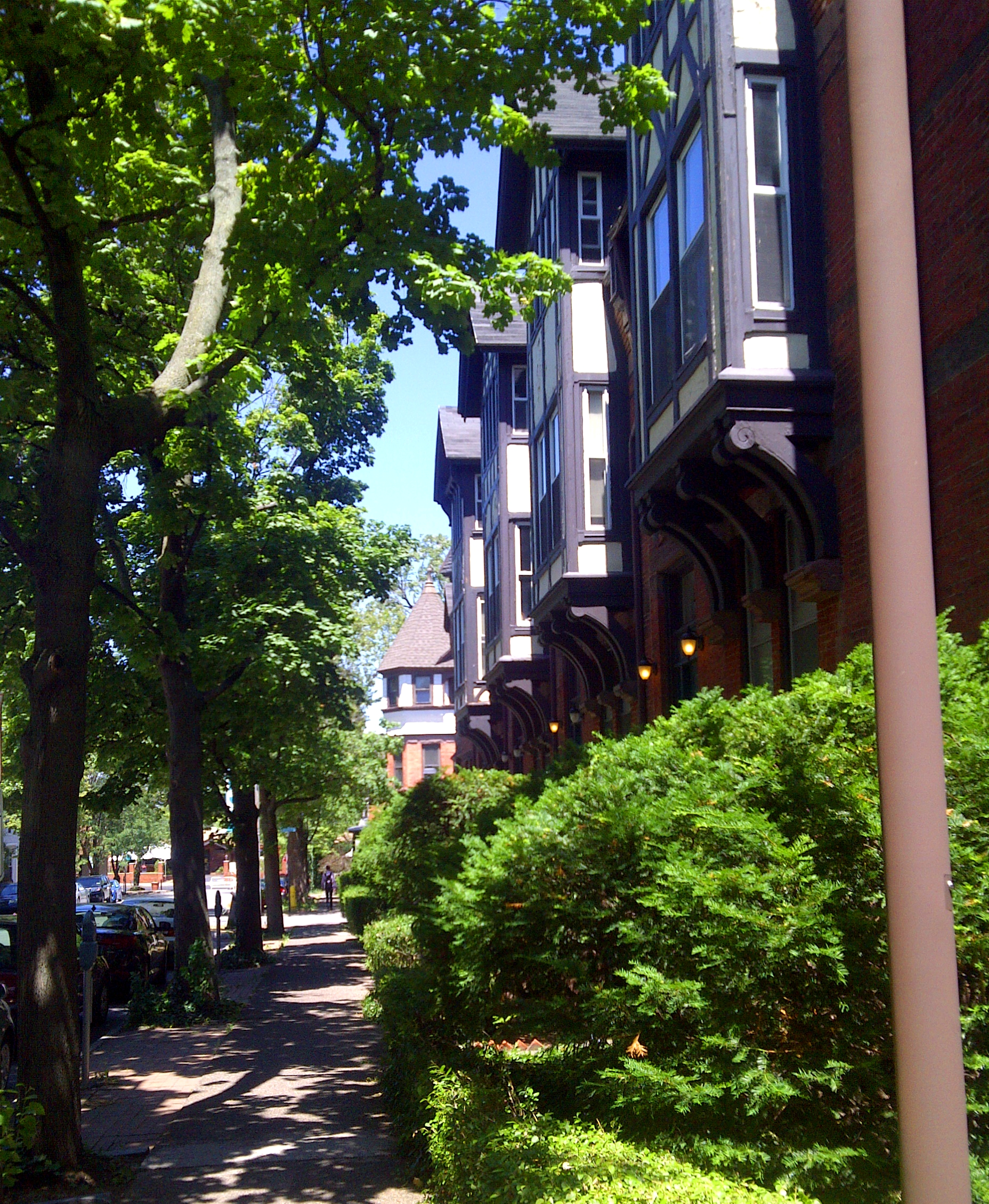
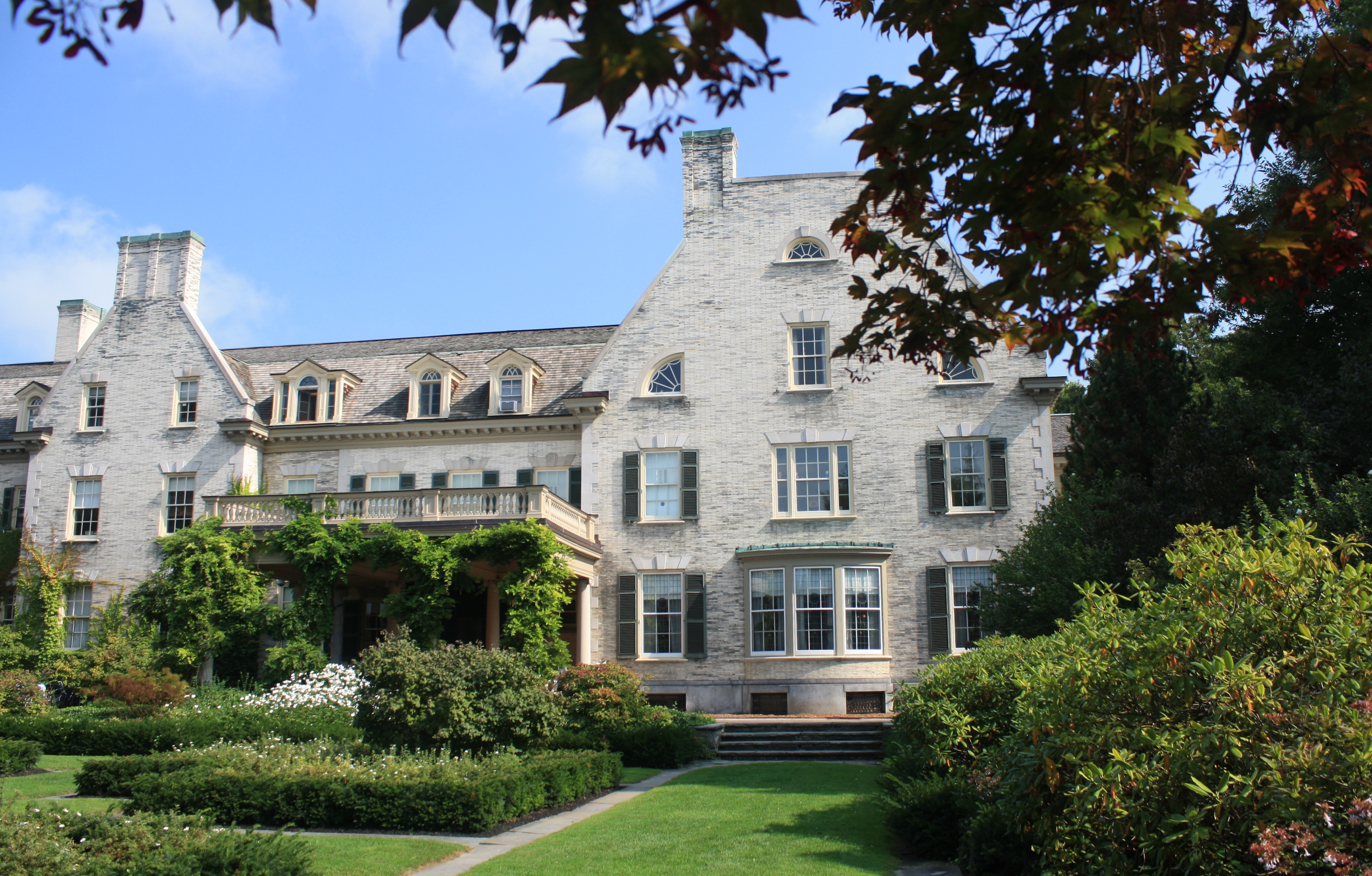
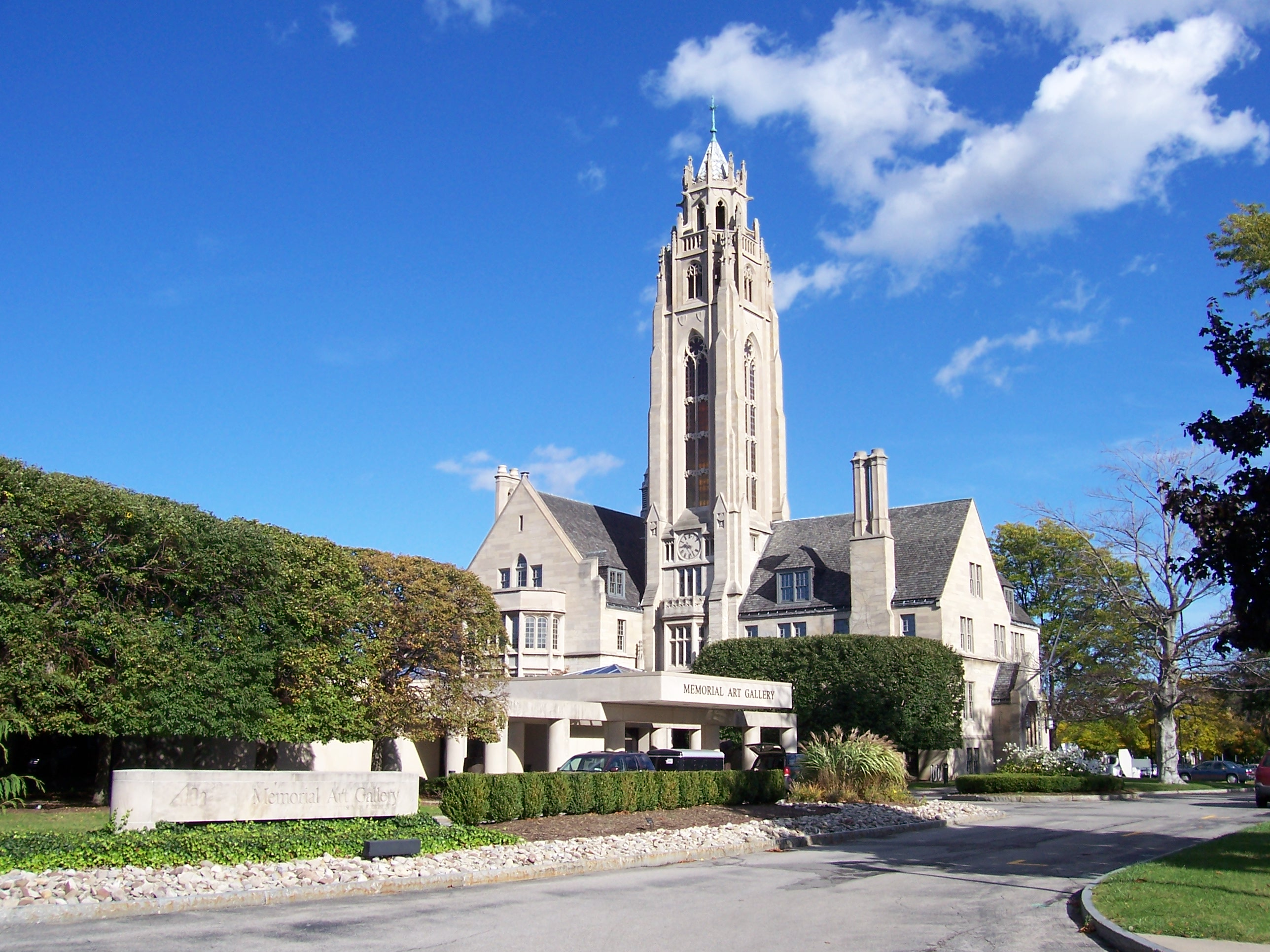
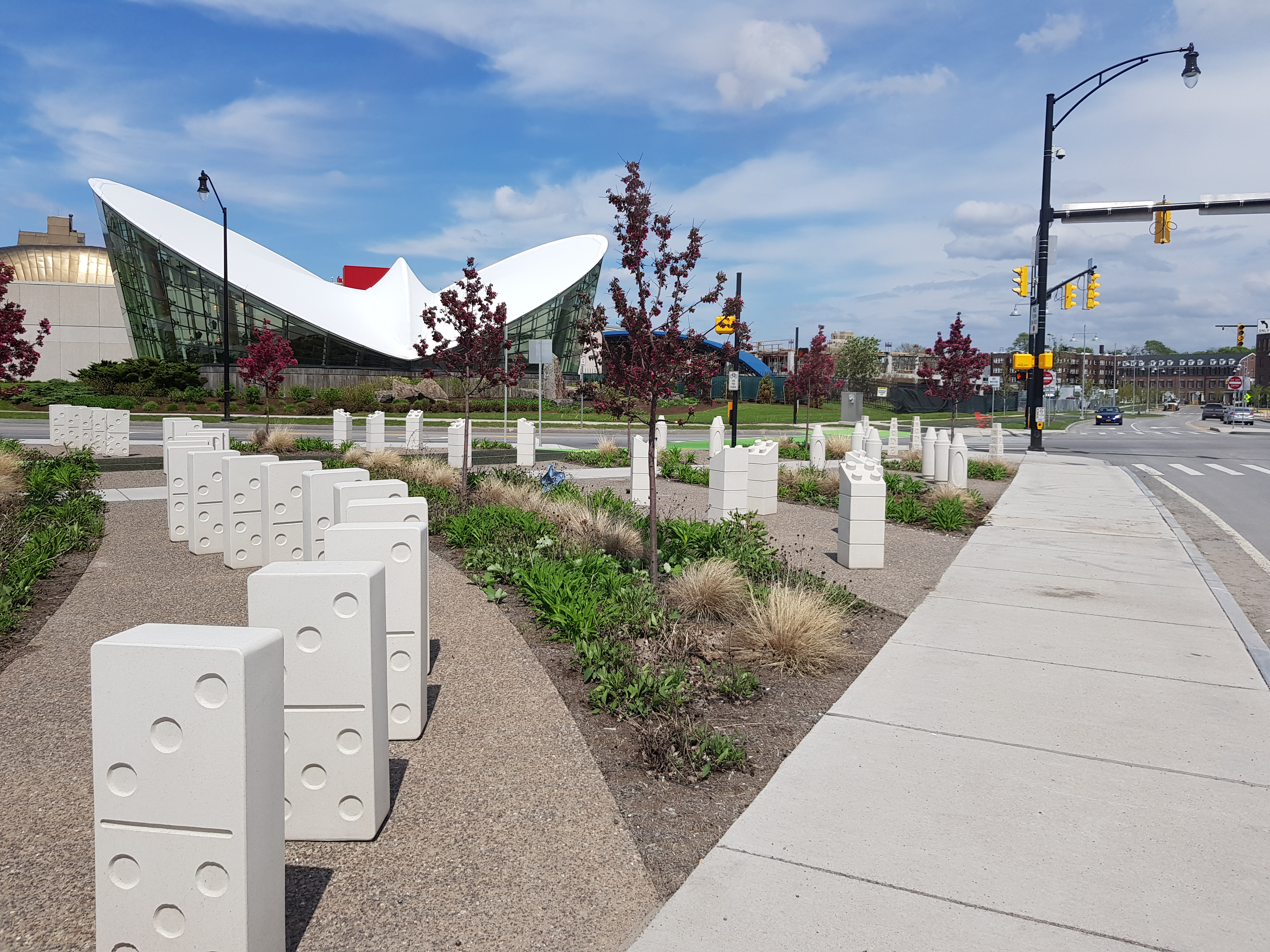
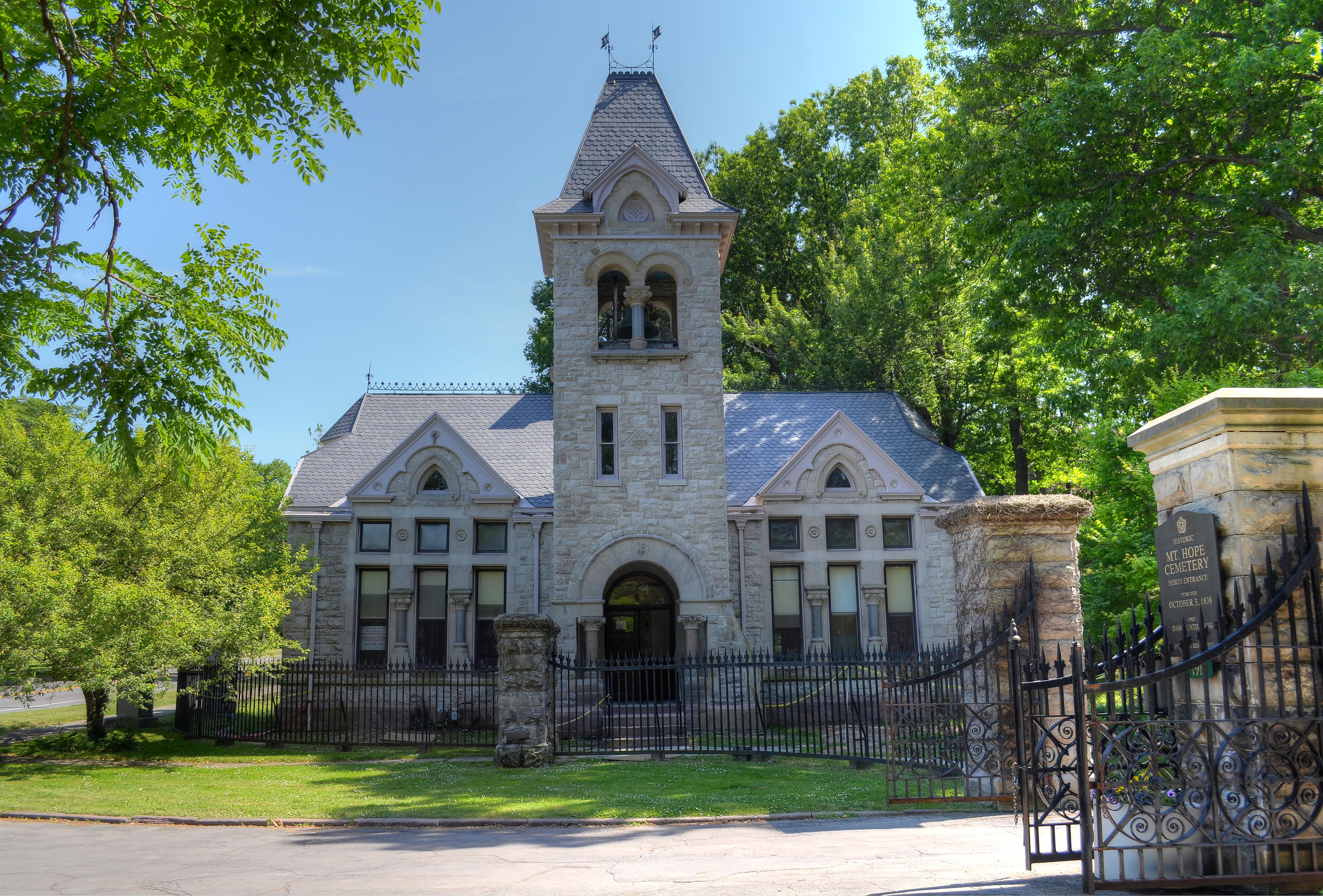
- Downtown Rochester University of Rochester Grove Place George Eastman Museum Memorial Art Gallery The Strong National Museum of Play Mount Hope Cemetery

- Flag Seal Logo
- Nicknames: "The Flour City", "The Flower City", "The World's Image Center", "Smugtown"
- Interactive map of Rochester, New York
- Location within New York Location within the United States
- Coordinates: 43°09′56″N 77°36′58″W
- Country: United States
- State: New York
- Region: Western New York; Genesee Valley; Finger Lakes Region
- Metro: Rochester metropolitan area
- County: Monroe
- Founded: 1788; 238 years ago
- Incorporated (village): March 21, 1817; 209 years ago (as Rochesterville)
- Incorporated (city): April 28, 1834; 192 years ago
- Named for: Nathaniel Rochester

Government
  - Type: Strong mayor-council
  - Mayor: Malik Evans (D)
  - City council: List: At-Large Members; President: • Miguel Meléndez (D); East District - Vice President: • Mary Lupien (D); Other At-Large: • Wilie Lightfoot (D); • Mitchell D. Gruber (D); • Stanley Martin (D); • Kim Smith (D); Northeast District: • Michael A. Patterson (D); South District: • LaShay Harris (D); Northwest District: • Bridget Monroe (D)

Area
  - City: 37.17 sq mi (96.27 km^{2})
  - Land: 35.76 sq mi (92.62 km^{2})
  - Water: 1.41 sq mi (3.65 km^{2}) 3.6%
- Highest elevation: 702 ft (214 m)
- Lowest elevation: 230 ft (70 m)

Population (2020)
  - City: 211,328
  - Estimate (2025): 206,108
  - Rank: US: 116th NY: 4th
  - Density: 5,909.4/sq mi (2,281.62/km^{2})
  - Urban: 704,327 (US: 62nd)
  - Urban density: 2,414/sq mi (931.9/km^{2})
  - Metro: 1,067,486 (US: 52nd)
- Demonym: Rochesterian
- Time zone: UTC−05:00 (EST)
  - Summer (DST): UTC−04:00 (EDT)
- ZIP codes: 146xx (14604=downtown)
- Area code: 585
- FIPS code: 36-63000
- GNIS feature ID: 979426
- Website: cityofrochester.gov

Rochester (Note: /ˈrɒtʃɛstər, -ɪs-/; ROTCH-ess-tər, -iss-; officially the City of Rochester) is a city in and the county seat of Monroe County, New York, United States. It is the fourth-most populous city in New York, with a population of 211,328 at the 2020 census (estimated at 206,108 as of 2025). The Rochester metropolitan area in Western New York has an estimated 1.05 million residents and is the 54th-largest metropolitan area in the U.S. Throughout its history, Rochester has acquired several nicknames based on local industries; it has been known as "the Flour City" and "the Flower City" for its dual role in flour production and floriculture, and as the "World's Image Center" for its association with film, optics, and photography.

The city was one of the United States' first boomtowns, initially due to the fertile Genesee River valley which gave rise to numerous flour mills, and then as a manufacturing center, which spurred further rapid population growth. Rochester has also played a key part in US history as a hub for social and political movements, especially abolitionism, and the women's rights movement.

Rochester is the birthplace or home of many notable companies including Eastman Kodak, Xerox, Bausch & Lomb, Wegmans, Constellation Brands, Gannett, Paychex, Western Union and Ray-Ban. In part due to their influence, the region became a global center for science, technology, and research and development. This has been aided by the presence of several internationally renowned universities, notably the University of Rochester and Rochester Institute of Technology (RIT), and their research programs; these schools, along with many other smaller colleges, have played an increasingly large role in its economy. The city experienced significant population decline due to deindustrialization in the late 20th century, although less severely than its Rust Belt peers. The Rochester metropolitan area is the fourth-largest regional economy in New York, after New York City, Buffalo–Niagara Falls and the Capital District.

Rochester is also known for its culture; in particular, the Eastman School of Music, one of the most prestigious conservatories in the world, and the Rochester International Jazz Festival anchor a vibrant music industry. It is the site of several museums such as The Strong National Museum of Play and the George Eastman Museum, which houses the oldest photography collection in the world.

== History ==
=== 18th century ===
The Seneca tribe of the Iroquois Confederacy lived around Rochester prior to the American Revolution, and used the area as a hunting ground. Allied with the British, the Seneca were forced to cede or sell most of their land in New York after the war. The area now occupied by Rochester was ceded in the Phelps and Gorham Purchase of 1788. As a reward for their loyalty to the British crown, the Iroquois were given a large land grant on the Grand River in Canada.

=== 19th century ===
Rochester was founded shortly after by a wave of English-Puritan-descended immigrants from New England, who were looking for new agricultural land. They were the dominant cultural group in Rochester for over a century. On November 8, 1803, three men from Hagerstown, Maryland, purchased a 100-acre (40-ha) tract from the Pulteney Estate along the Genesee River: Major Charles Carroll, Colonel William Fitzhugh Jr, and Colonel Nathaniel Rochester, the namesake of the city. They chose the site because its three cataracts on the Genesee offered great potential for water power. Beginning in 1811, and with a population of 15, the three founders surveyed the land and laid out streets and tracts. In 1817, the Brown brothers and other landowners joined their lands with the Hundred Acre Tract to form the village of Rochesterville. This name was unpopular, and in 1822 it was shortened to Rochester.

By 1821, Rochesterville became the seat of Monroe County. In 1823, the Erie Canal aqueduct over the Genesee River was completed, connecting the city to the Hudson River to the east. New commerce from the canal turned the village into America's first boomtown. By 1830, Rochester's population had grown to 9,200, and in 1834, it was rechartered as a city. Rochester was first known as "the Young Lion of the West", and then as the "Flour City". By 1838, it was the largest flour-producing city in the United States. A series of religious revivals occurred as part of the Second Great Awakening, including a particularly notable revival led by Charles Grandison Finney which inspired local social reform movements.

During the mid-19th century, as the center of the wheat-processing industry moved west with population and agriculture, the city became home to an expanding nursery business, giving rise to the city's second nickname, the Flower City. Nurseries ringed the city, the most famous of which was started in 1840 by immigrants George Ellwanger from Germany and Patrick Barry from Ireland. Shoemaking also became a major local industry as the city began to industrialize.

In 1847, Frederick Douglass founded The North Star, an abolitionist newspaper, in Rochester. A former slave and an antislavery speaker and writer, he gained a circulation of over 4,000 subscribers in the United States, Europe, and the Caribbean. Douglass lived in Rochester until his home was destroyed in a fire in 1872, and a historical marker was erected at the site on South Avenue. Many other prominent abolitionists operated in the area and operated on the Underground Railroad, such as Thomas James and Austin Steward.

Around the same time, the nearby Finger Lakes region was the birthplace of the women's suffrage movement. A critical suffragettes' convention was held in 1848 in nearby Seneca Falls, and Rochester was the home of Susan B. Anthony along with other notable Suffragettes such as Abigail Bush and Amy Post. The city itself played host to the Rochester Women's Rights Convention of 1848. The Nineteenth Amendment to the United States Constitution, in 1920, which guaranteed the right of women to vote, was known as the Susan B. Anthony Amendment because of her work toward its passage, which she did not live to see. Anthony's home is a National Historic Landmark known as the National Susan B. Anthony Museum and House.

=== 20th century ===
Rochester saw an expansion of new industries in the late 19th century and early 20th century. Irish immigrant James Cunningham founded the carriagemaker James Cunningham, Son and Company. James Cunningham and Sons later founded the Cunningham Car Company, a pioneer automobile maker. German immigrants John Jacob Bausch and Henry Lomb launched Bausch & Lomb in 1861 and inventor and entrepreneur George Eastman founded Eastman Kodak in 1892. In 1895, trucking executive George F. Roth and others founded the Rochester Cash Register Company, and obtained a patent for an "improvement in cash registers". Their company failed, however, in 1899, and its patents were sold to the National Cash Register Company.

Xerox was founded in Rochester in 1906 as the Haloid Company. In the early 20th century, Rochester became a center of the garment industry, particularly men's fashions. It was the base of Bond Clothing Stores, Fashion Park Clothes, Hickey Freeman, and Stein-Bloch and Co. The Erie Canal was rerouted south of Rochester by 1918 to allow widening as part of the Barge Canal's construction. The short-lived Rochester subway was constructed in the abandoned canal bed and operated from 1927 to 1956.

The dawn of the 20th century in Rochester saw rapid growth, driven by waves of immigrants arriving from Germany, Italy, Poland, and elsewhere. The city also grew in area, annexing suburban neighborhoods from the surrounding towns to arrive at its present borders. The population reached 62,386 in 1870, 162,608 in 1900, and 295,750 in 1920. By 1950, the population had reached a high of 332,488. The surge in new arrivals, along with increased industrialization, resulted in the city becoming a hotbed of labor activism. From the 1920s and continuing into the post-war era Rochester grew into a power center for newly formed industrial unions. It was one of the very few American cities where the labor movement was powerful enough to mount a successful general strike when in 1946 an estimated 50,000 workers across multiple sectors walked off in support of hundreds of city employees who had been fired for attempting to unionize.

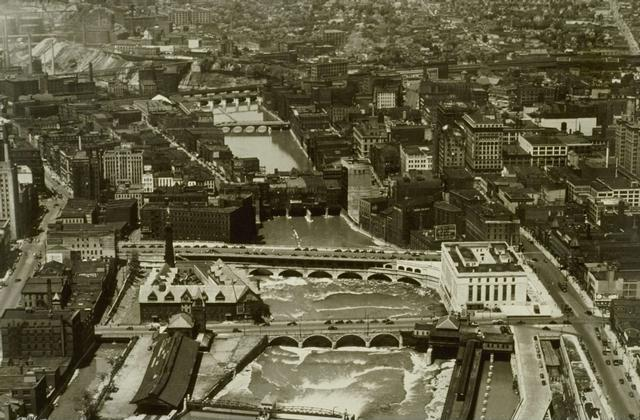
Rochester in 1938

During World War II, Rochester factories produced a variety of goods for the war effort, including fuel tanker ships, optical equipment, and radio proximity fuses, amounting to US$1,200,000,000 of military orders. Following the war, the city began engaging in urban renewal projects to revitalize downtown, including the construction of Midtown Plaza and freeways like the Inner Loop, and the demolition of the Front Street neighborhood. By the 1970s, the city experienced highway revolts against new projects, and in the 2010s, the city began filling in the Inner Loop to restore older neighborhoods.

In 1950, the Census Bureau reported Rochester's population as 97.6% White and 2.3% Black. Rochester's black population tripled to more than 25,000 during the 1950s. Casually employed by the city's major industries, most African Americans in the city held low-pay and low-skill jobs, and lived in substandard housing. Discontent exploded in the three-day 1964 Rochester race riot, which resulted in five deaths, 350 injuries, nearly a thousand arrests, and 204 stores looted or damaged. In the wake of the riot, the Rochester Area Churches, together with black civil rights leaders, invited Saul Alinsky of the Industrial Areas Foundation to help the community organize. With the Reverend Franklin Florence, they established FIGHT (Freedom, Integration, God, Honor, Today), which successfully brought pressure to bear on Eastman Kodak to help open up employment and city governance.

In 1992, Rochester tried to help the closing factories by turning the historic High Falls industrial area into a tourist "Entertainment District". They built a laser light show over the waterfall, as well as a "Center at High Falls Museum" and brought in restaurants and nightclubs. While it was a hit in the 1990s, the district struggled to stay profitable by the early-2000s as businesses continued to move out.

In 1997, Kodak announced it would be laying off 10,000 employees globally, with a huge portion of those in Rochester. This was a largest job cut announcement in U.S. history at the time. It signaled to the city that the era of Kodak's dominance in the area was officially over.

With industrial restructuring in the later 20th century, Rochester's manufacturing workforce shrank. Kodak, long the city's largest employer, conducted massive layoffs prior to a 2012 bankruptcy. Demographic changes also occurred, including thousands of Puerto Ricans moving to the city after World War II.

=== 21st century ===
By 2022, the city's population had declined to 209,352 (although the metropolitan area was considerably larger) with 45.1% recorded as White and 38.4% as Black or African American. Although the total population declined, new arrivals continued to move to the city and change its demographic profile. The city became a major destination for refugees in the 21st century. In 2017, Rochester affirmed its status as a sanctuary city.

In April 2025, the Trump administration sued the city for its sanctuary city rules. A judge dismissed the case in November of the same year, but the government immediately refiled it. As of early 2026, Rochester asked the court to throw out the case again, arguing that the city has a Tenth Amendment right to choose which federal laws it helps enforce. Mayor Evans has led this charge against Trump.

Also in early 2026, New York State committed $75 million to give Rochester its first-ever state park. The state park will cover over 40 acres around the 80-foot High Falls waterfall and is part of a plan to bring more tourists and businesses back to the downtown area.

== Geography ==
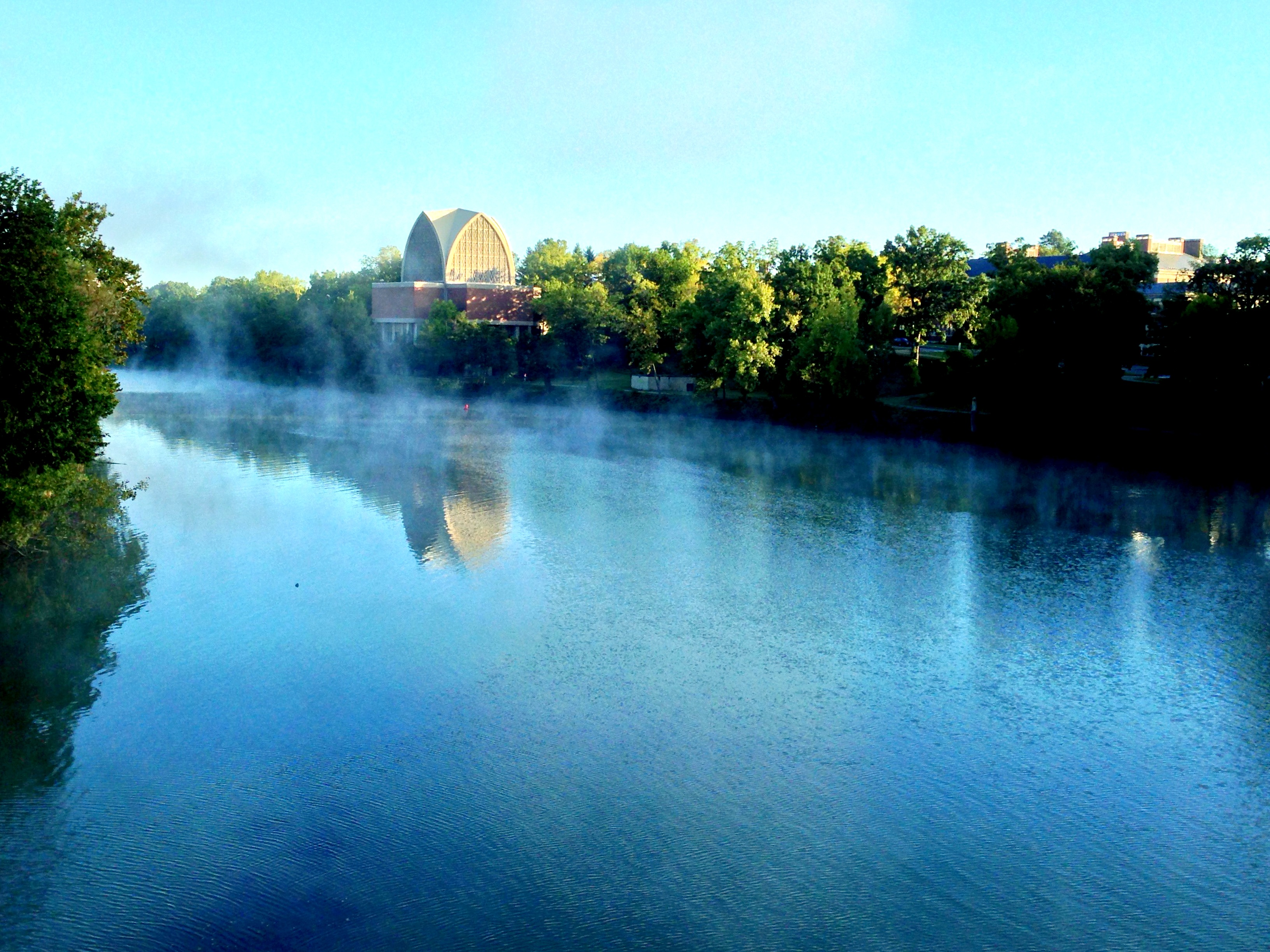
The Genesee River in 2013

Rochester is located in Upstate New York, on the southern shore of Lake Ontario. The Genesee River bisects the city. According to the United States Census Bureau, the city has a total area of 37.1 square miles (96 km^{2}), of which 35.8 square miles (93 km^{2}) are land and 1.3 square miles (3.4 km^{2}) are covered by water (3.42%). Rochester borders the towns of Irondequoit to the north and northeast, Brighton to the southeast and south, Chili to the southwest, Gates to the west, and Greece to the northwest.

Rochester's landscape was formed by the ice sheets during the Pleistocene epoch. The retreating ice sheets reached a standstill at what is now the southern border of the city, melting at the same rate as they were advancing, depositing sediment along the southern edge of the ice mass. This created a line of hills, including (from west to east) Mt. Hope, the hills of Highland Park, Pinnacle Hill, and Cobb's Hill. Because the sediment of these hills was deposited into a proglacial lake, they are stratified and classified as a "kame delta". A brief retreat and readvance of the ice sheet onto the delta deposited unstratified material there, creating a rare hybrid structure called "kame moraine". The ice sheets also created Lake Ontario, the Genesee River with its waterfalls and gorges, Irondequoit Bay, Sodus Bay, Braddock Bay, Mendon Ponds, numerous local streams and ponds, the Ridge, and the nearby Finger Lakes.

Water to the city is sourced from Hemlock Lake, Canadice Lake, and Lake Ontario.

=== Neighborhoods ===
Celebrate City Living, a partnership program between the city government and Rochester Coalition for Neighborhood Living, defines 35 neighborhoods in Rochester. Among these are the 14621 Community, 19th Ward, Beechwood, Browncroft, Charlotte, Cobbs Hill, Corn Hill, downtown Rochester, Dutchtown, Edgerton, EMMA (East Main, Mustard & Atlantic Avenue), High Falls, Highland Park, Homestead Heights, JOSANA (Jay-Orchard Street Area), Lincoln Park, Lyell-Otis, Maplewood, Marketview Heights, Mayor's Heights, Monroe Village, NOTA (Neighborhood of the Arts), North Winton Village, Northland-Lyceum, Park Avenue, Plymouth-Exchange, South Wedge, Susan B. Anthony, Swillburg, Upper Falls, Upper Monroe, and Upper Mount Hope.

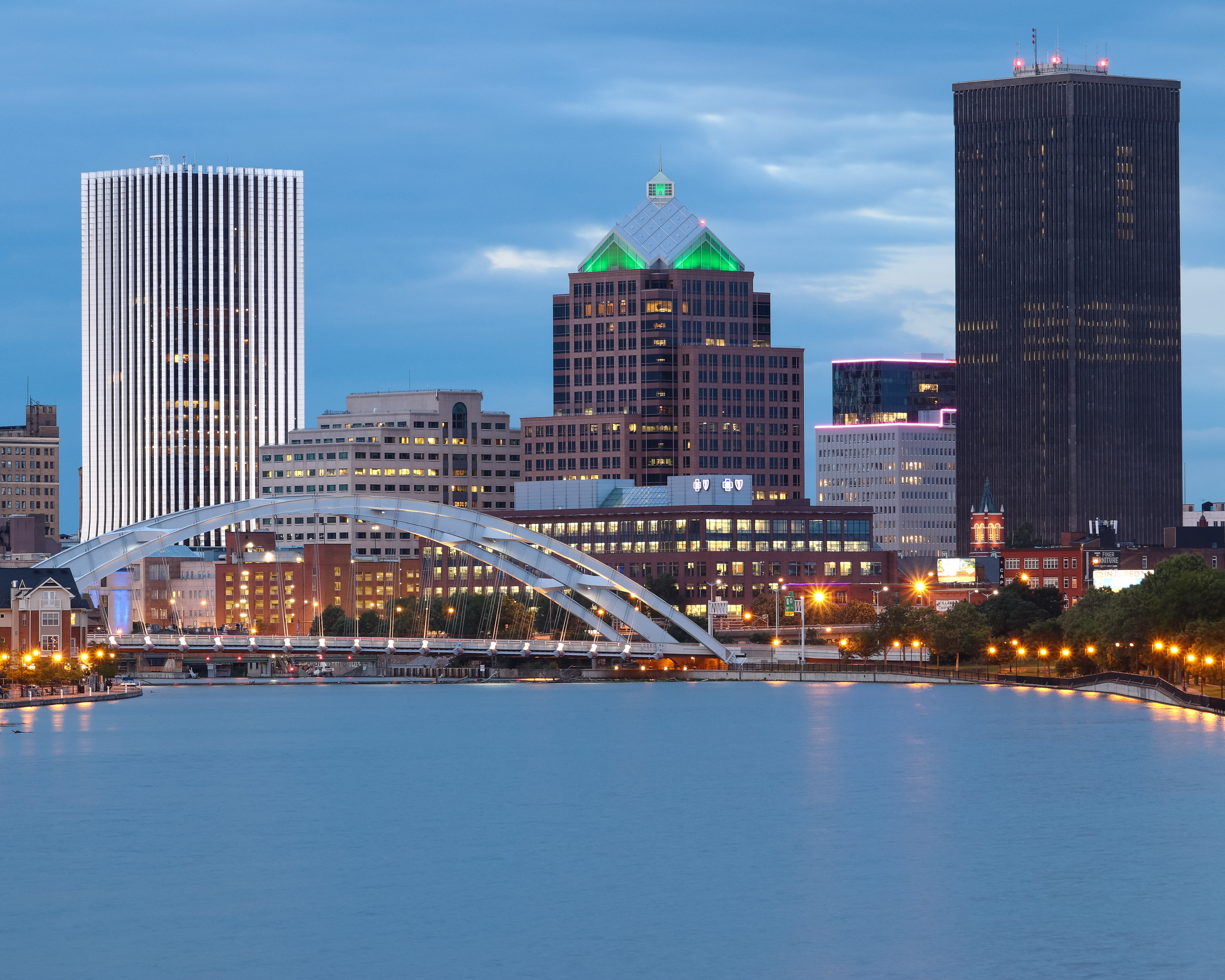
Center City and the Frederick Douglass–Susan B. Anthony Memorial Bridge

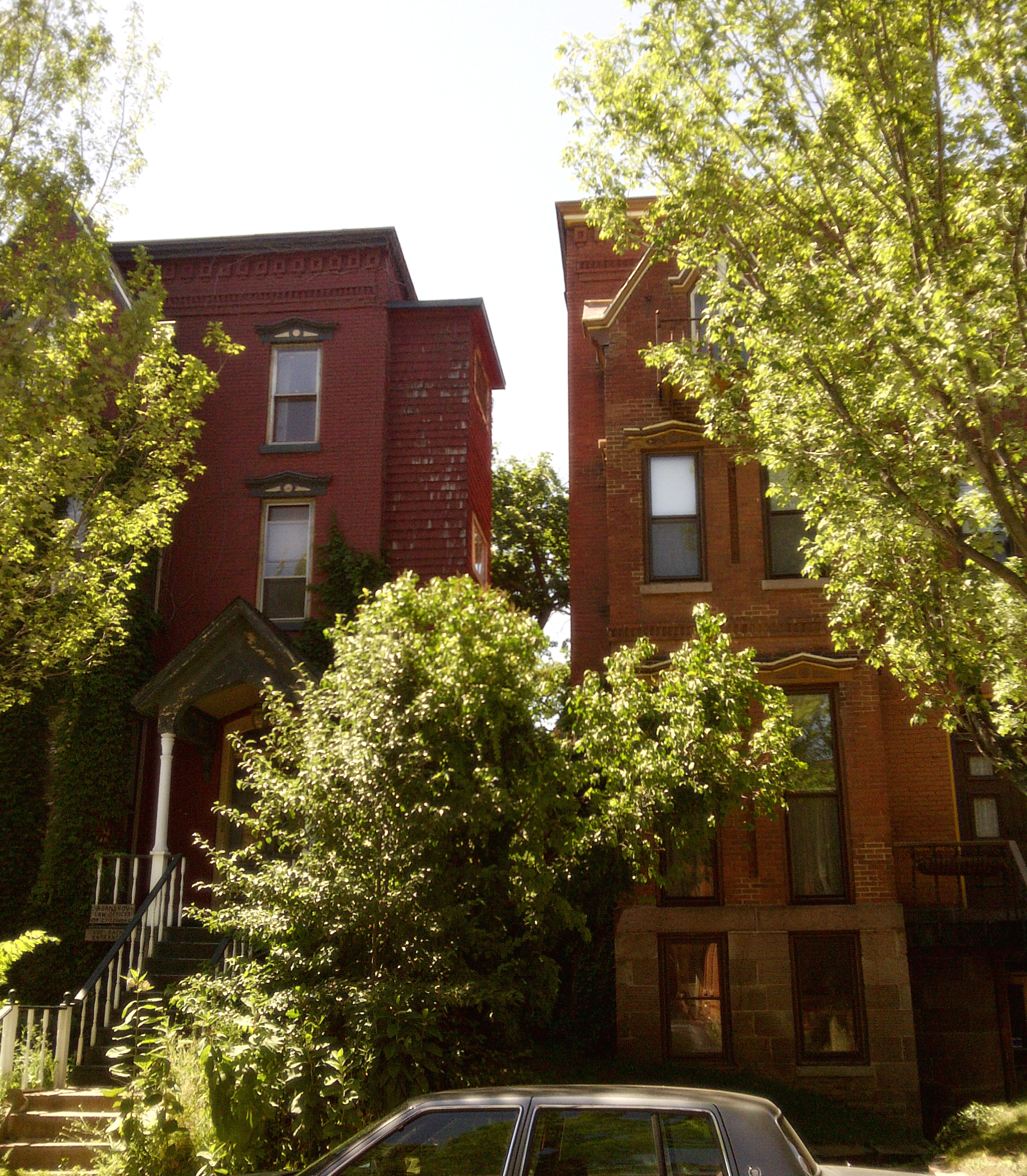
Townhouses in Corn Hill

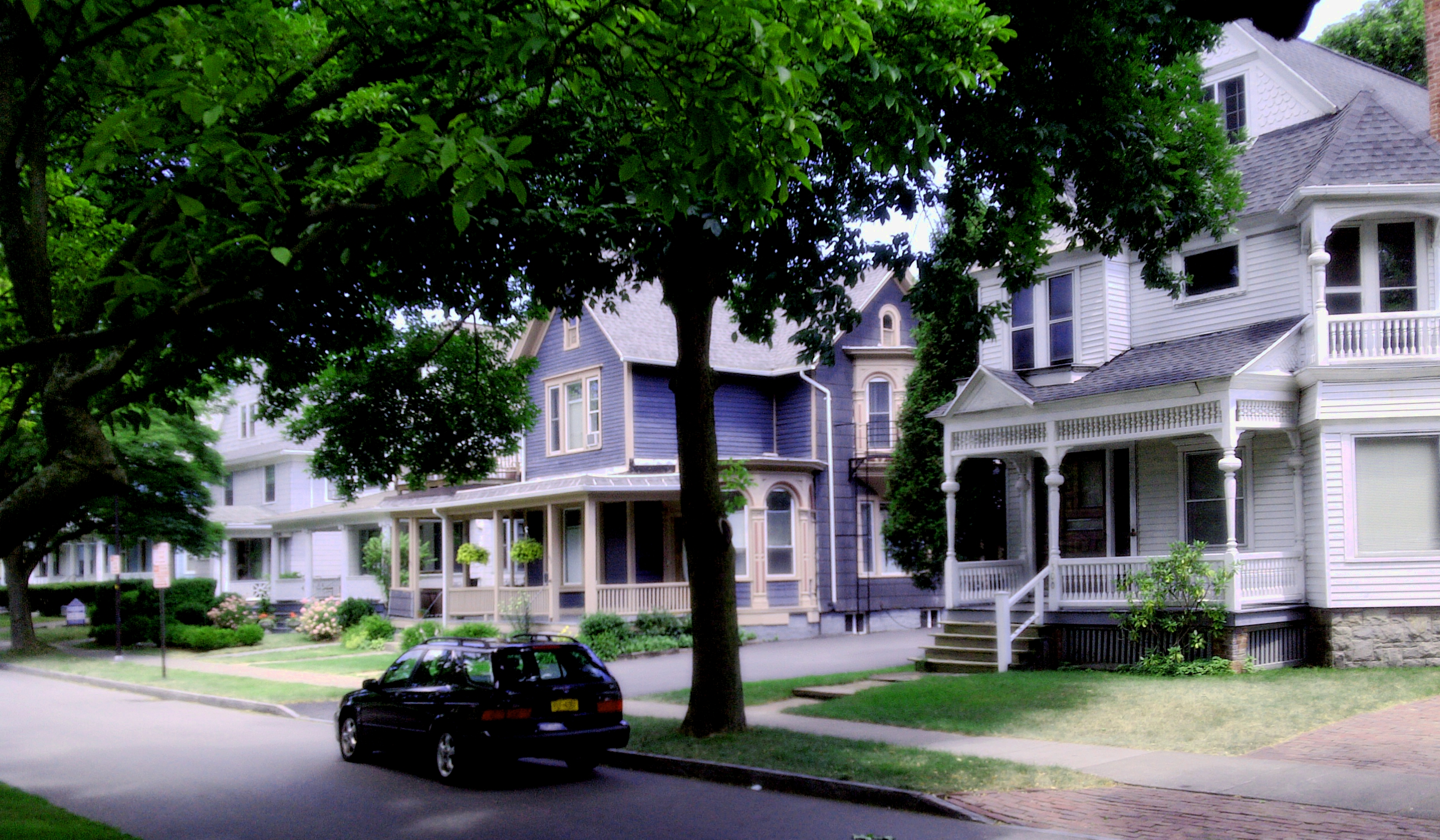
Oxford Street Houses

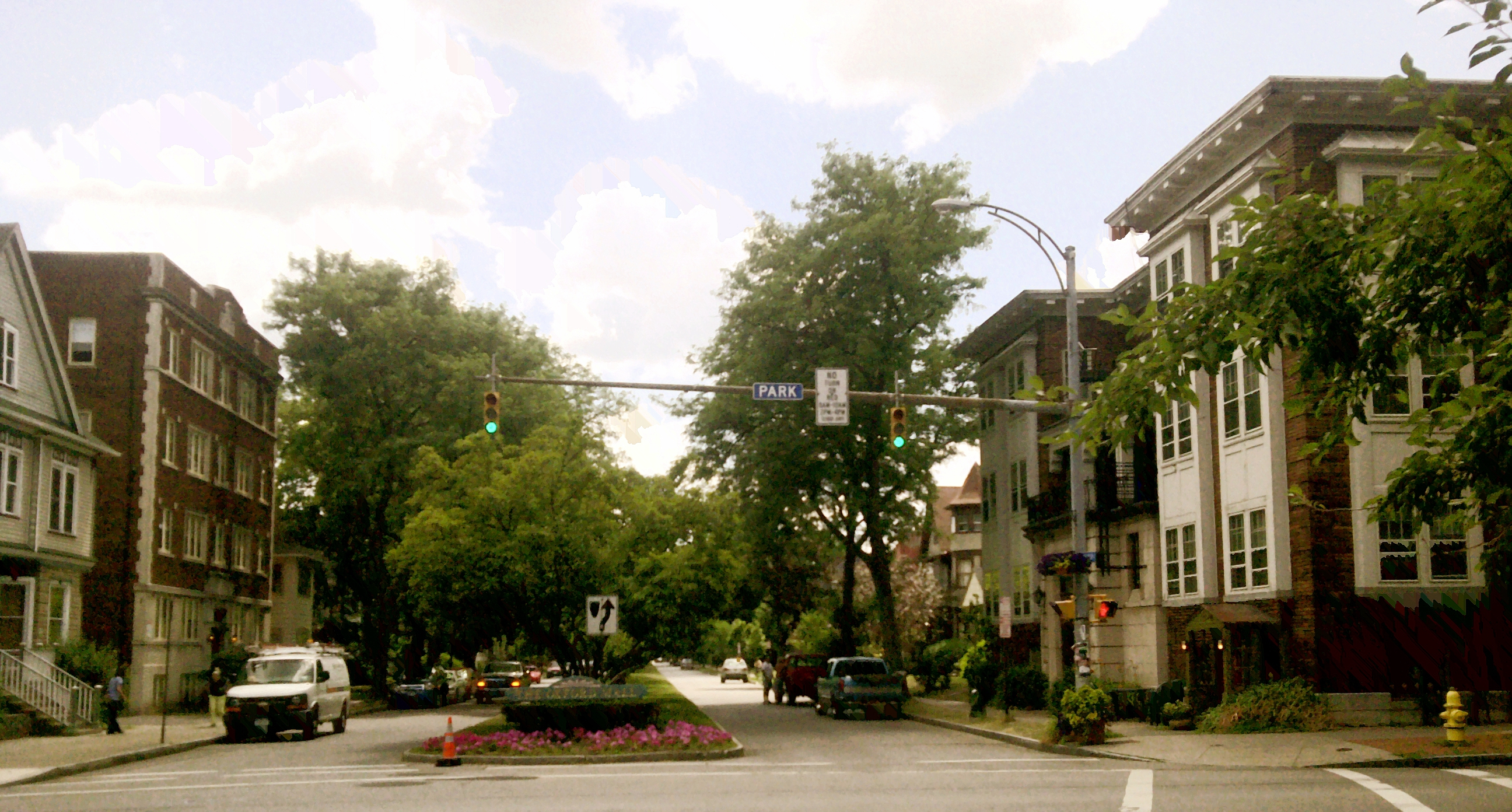
Park and Oxford

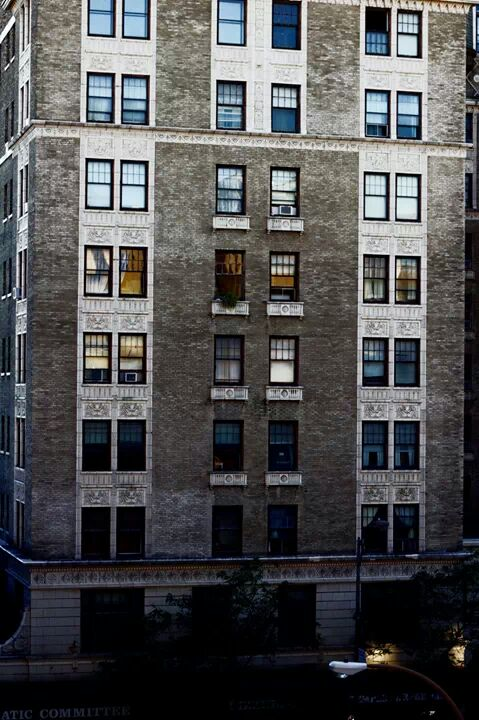
Apartments in Rochester's East End

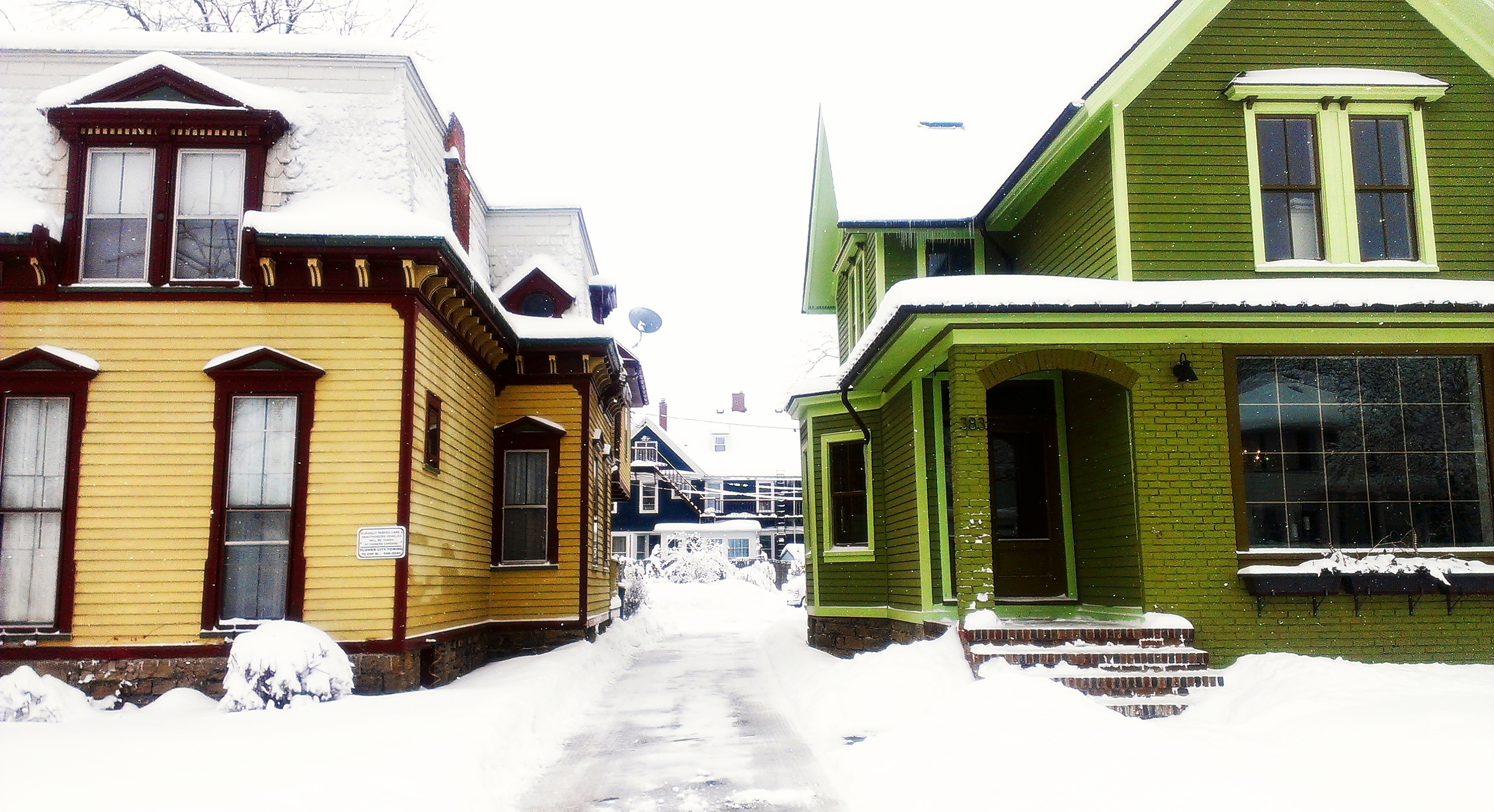
Houses on Park Avenue

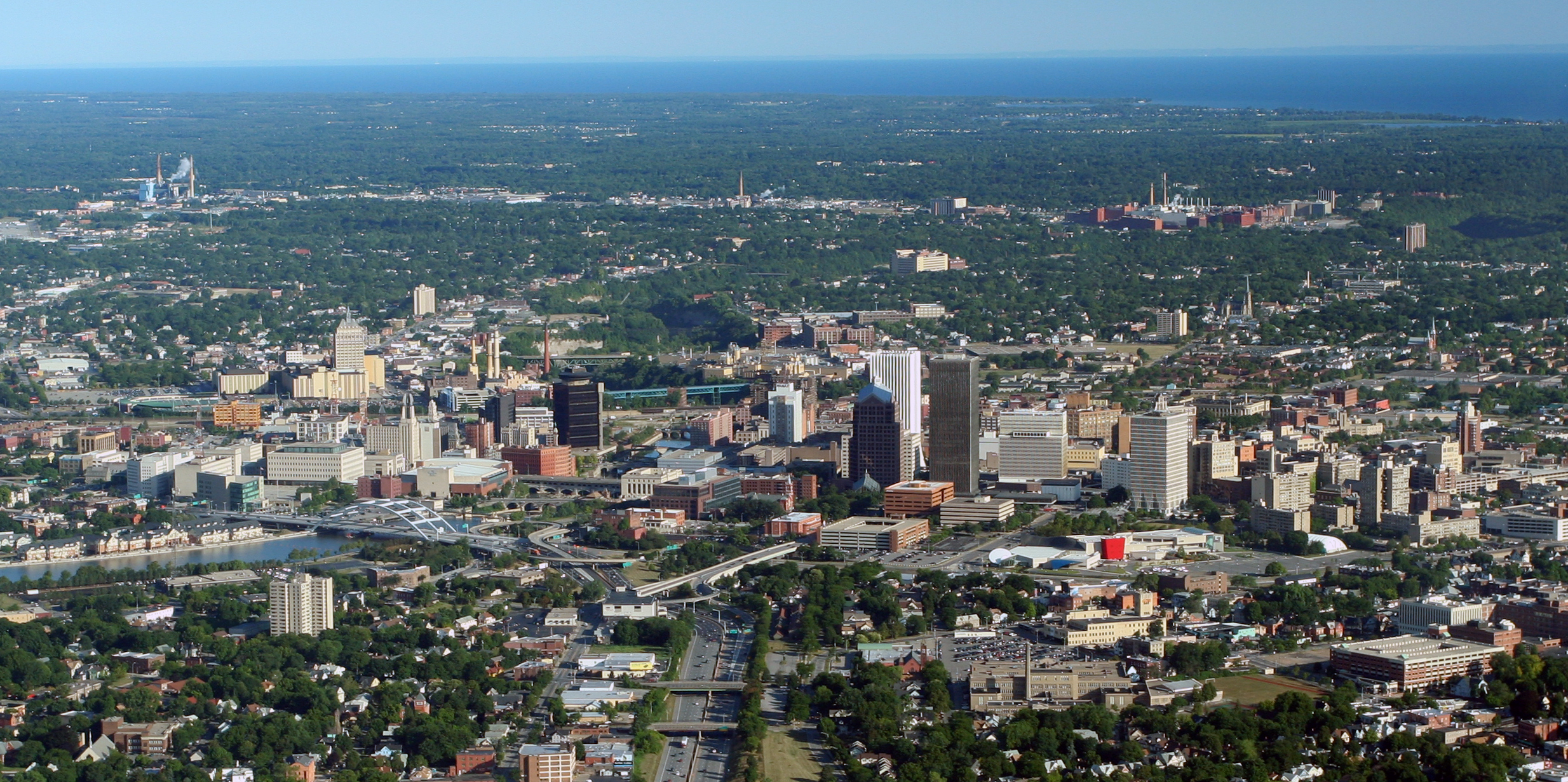
An aerial image of the city of Rochester taken in August 2007

==== 19th Ward ====
The 19th Ward is a southwest neighborhood bordered by Genesee Street, West Avenue, and the Erie Canal, and is across the river from the University of Rochester. The neighborhood is one of the largest in Rochester. Now known by its slogan "Urban by Choice", in the early 19th century, the area was known as Castle Town, after Castle Inn, a tavern run by Colonel Isaac Castle. By the early 1820s, however, the area was overshadowed by developments in the north that became downtown Rochester. Due to a tumultuous bend in the Genesee, the area was home to skilled boatsmen who assisted boats traveling north to Rochester and the area was consequently known during this time as "The Rapids". In the 1890s, as Rochester expanded, the area rapidly urbanized. By 1930, it was a booming residential area for doctors, lawyers, and other skilled workers. Homes in the originally upper-class neighborhood typically have gumwood trim, leaded glass, fireplaces, hardwood floors, and open porches. In the 1960s, property values fell as the population of Rochester did, the area experienced white flight accelerated by school busing, blockbusting, and race riots downtown, and crime increased, with violence, drug use, and neglected property further diminishing property values. In recent years, neighborhood revitalization has come from the "Brooks Landing" development along the Genesee River. Gentrification has occurred in the 19th Ward and adjacent Plymouth-Exchange area from the conversion of housing stock to student housing for the University of Rochester. Located in the 19th Ward are the Arvine Heights Historic District, Chili–West Historic District, Inglewood and Thurston Historic District, and Sibley–Elmdorf Historic District, listed on the National Register of Historic Places.

==== Browncroft ====
The Browncroft neighborhood is built on the former nursery grounds of the Brown Brothers nursery, between the town of Brighton and Winton Road. Many Tudor and Colonial houses are contained within, and the business district situated on Winton Road has a mix of restaurants and shops. The Browncroft Historic District was listed on the National Register of Historic Places in 2004.

==== Charlotte ====
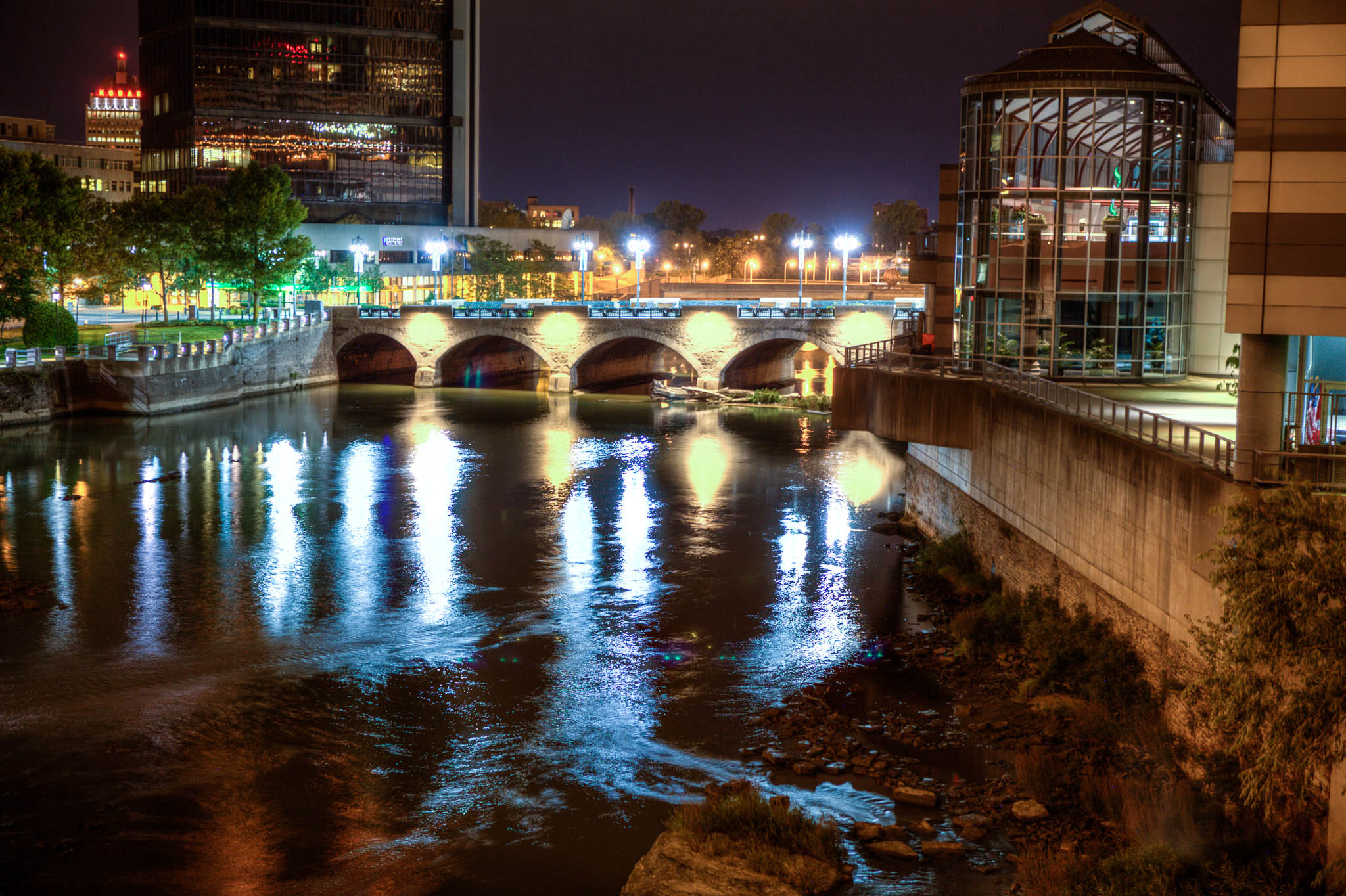
Genesee River and the historic Aqueduct Downtown

Charlotte is a lakefront community in Rochester bordering Lake Ontario. It is home to Ontario Beach Park, commonly known as Charlotte Beach, which is a popular summer destination for Rochesterians. A new terminal was built in 2004 for the Rochester-to-Toronto ferry service and was later sold after the ferry ceased operations in 2005. The Port of Rochester terminal still exists, but multiple attempts by the city to make additions have failed since 2016.

==== Corn Hill ====
Corn Hill is located in the city's old Third Ward, and best known today for the annual Corn Hill Arts Festival. Many of the city's wealthiest residents lived in the neighborhood during the 19th century, but they relocated to the East End and suburbs after the turn of the century. The neighborhood experienced decline, and much of the Third Ward was demolished for the construction of I-490 in the 1960s. Revival began in the late 1960s, as several of the Victorian homes in the neighborhood were restored by the Genesee Landmarks Foundation. In 1969 the Corn Hill arts festival was held and became an annual feature. The Third Ward Historic District was listed on the National Register of Historic Places in 1974.

==== Edgerton ====
The Edgerton neighborhood is in the city's northwest quadrant, along Lake Avenue. Historically an Italian-American neighborhood, the area around Lyell Avenue has been a target for the formation of a designated Little Italy neighborhood, although few Italian Americans live there today. The neighborhood is known for struggling with a high crime rate. Residents have pursued a number of strategies to improve the neighborhood in recent years, including the construction of housing for the homeless. The neighborhood features Edgerton Park, which was once home to most of the city's professional sports teams.

==== Maplewood ====
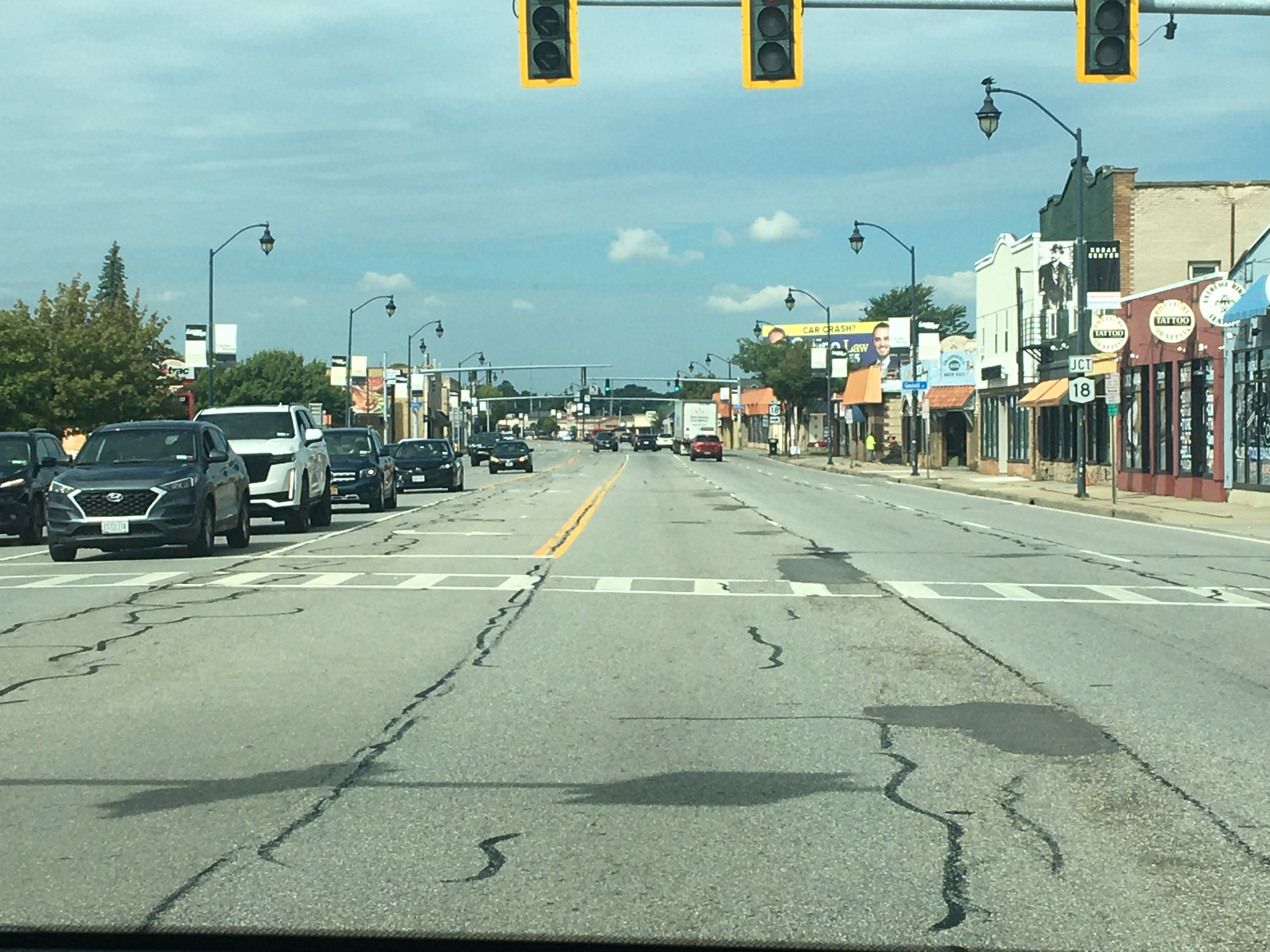
A commercial part of Ridge Road in Maplewood

Maplewood is located in the northwest quadrant, centered around Lake Avenue and Maplewood Park. Eastman Business Park is located on its north edge. The neighborhood once contained both mansions for the wealthy and worker housing for nearby factories like Kodak's. Many of the neighborhood's old mansions have been converted to multi-family housing. Due to its diverse architectural heritage, the Maplewood Historic District was listed on the National Register of Historic Places in 1997.

==== Marketview Heights ====
The Marketview Heights neighborhood is northeast of downtown Rochester, running east from Union Street just north of Atlantic Ave. It is best known as the location of the Public Market, which first opened in 1905 and offers a variety of groceries and other goods from farms and shops from surrounding areas, primarily on the weekends. In the late twentieth century, the neighborhood experienced a severe decline, and roughly half of residents lived below the poverty line in 2000. Public investment was made in the neighborhood after 2008 to implement a number of community proposals. A second round of proposals are being explored currently for the planned removal of the Inner Loop in the southern end of the neighborhood.

==== Park Avenue ====
Park Avenue is centered on the eponymous street southeast of downtown. It originally functioned as a service street with businesses that catered to wealthy residents who lived on nearby East Avenue. Between 1894 and 1975, it was also home to Park Avenue Hospital. Today, the neighborhood is one of the most desirable in the city, highly valued for its walkability and density of bars, clubs, and restaurants. The city's annual pride parade is hosted in the neighborhood. The Park Avenue Historic District was listed on the National Register of Historic Places in 2020.

==== South Wedge ====
The South Wedge is a wedge-shaped neighborhood centered on South Avenue between the Genesee River and Interstate 490. It began as the home of several families involved in trades on the Erie Canal. In the 1840s, the Ellwanger and Barry nursery was built on South Avenue, introducing greenery to the neighborhood and drawing tourists. Frederick Douglass lived in a house in the neighborhood. The area fell on hard times after World War II, when residents moved to the suburbs and several homes and businesses were abandoned. The South Wedge Planning Committee was established in 1973 to revitalize the neighborhood. Today, the neighborhood is a hub of small businesses. The South Wedge Historic District was listed on the National Register of Historic Places in 2013, and the Gregory Tract Historic District was listed in 2022.

=== Climate ===
Rochester lies in the humid continental climate zone (Köppen: Dfa) and has four distinct seasons.

Winters are cold (temperatures drop to 0 °F (−18 °C) on 4.2 nights annually). Like much of the eastern Great Lakes, Rochester is very cloudy and overcast in winter. Rochester normally receives heavy snow in winter (primarily lake effect snow resulting from its location on the southern shores of Lake Ontario), ranking among the snowiest large cities on earth and occasionally setting records for annual snowfall among large US metros. The 30-year annual average snowfall is just above 100 in (2.5 m). Spring sees plentiful rain with the rising temperatures, and occasional late snowstorms depending on the year. Summers are warm and sunny; there are occasional short periods of high heat and humidity but in general, Rochester is set apart from most of the continental US by comparatively cool, comfortable summers (ranking among the top five coolest summers among large metros alongside San Francisco, Seattle, Portland, Oregon, and neighboring Buffalo). Autumn features brilliant foliage colors, cooling temperatures and occasionally an excess of rain depending on the year, though precipitation is generally plentiful and dispersed fairly evenly throughout the year.

Climate data for Rochester, New York (Greater Rochester Int'l), 1991–2020 normals, (Note: Mean monthly maxima and minima (i.e. the expected highest and lowest temperature readings at any point during the year or given month) calculated based on data at said location from 1991 to 2020.) extremes 1871−present (Note: Official records for Rochester kept January 1871 to September 1940 at downtown and at Greater Rochester Int'l since October 1940. For more information, see Threadex)
Month	Jan	Feb	Mar	Apr	May	Jun	Jul	Aug	Sep	Oct	Nov	Dec	Year
Record high °F (°C)	74 (23)	73 (23)	86 (30)	93 (34)	94 (34)	100 (38)	102 (39)	99 (37)	99 (37)	91 (33)	81 (27)	72 (22)	102 (39)
Mean maximum °F (°C)	57.2 (14.0)	55.1 (12.8)	67.1 (19.5)	79.9 (26.6)	86.7 (30.4)	90.5 (32.5)	92.1 (33.4)	90.4 (32.4)	87.7 (30.9)	80.0 (26.7)	68.5 (20.3)	57.5 (14.2)	93.4 (34.1)
Mean daily maximum °F (°C)	33.4 (0.8)	35.2 (1.8)	43.6 (6.4)	55.5 (13.1)	69.4 (20.8)	77.9 (25.5)	82.5 (28.1)	80.5 (26.9)	73.6 (23.1)	61.2 (16.2)	49.1 (9.5)	38.5 (3.6)	58.5 (14.7)
Daily mean °F (°C)	26.2 (−3.2)	27.4 (−2.6)	35.2 (1.8)	46.8 (8.2)	58.8 (14.9)	67.6 (19.8)	72.3 (22.4)	70.7 (21.5)	63.6 (17.6)	52.2 (11.2)	41.5 (5.3)	32.0 (0.0)	49.5 (9.7)
Mean daily minimum °F (°C)	19.0 (−7.2)	19.6 (−6.9)	26.8 (−2.9)	37.1 (2.8)	48.2 (9.0)	57.4 (14.1)	62.2 (16.8)	61.0 (16.1)	53.6 (12.0)	43.3 (6.3)	34.0 (1.1)	25.4 (−3.7)	40.6 (4.8)
Mean minimum °F (°C)	−0.8 (−18.2)	0.5 (−17.5)	8.4 (−13.1)	24.1 (−4.4)	34.4 (1.3)	43.9 (6.6)	50.7 (10.4)	49.2 (9.6)	39.6 (4.2)	29.7 (−1.3)	18.6 (−7.4)	7.7 (−13.5)	−3.7 (−19.8)
Record low °F (°C)	−17 (−27)	−22 (−30)	−9 (−23)	7 (−14)	26 (−3)	35 (2)	42 (6)	36 (2)	28 (−2)	19 (−7)	1 (−17)	−16 (−27)	−22 (−30)
Average precipitation inches (mm)	2.55 (65)	2.13 (54)	2.49 (63)	2.99 (76)	2.86 (73)	3.37 (86)	3.56 (90)	3.31 (84)	3.18 (81)	3.22 (82)	2.76 (70)	2.67 (68)	35.09 (891)
Average snowfall inches (cm)	27.4 (70)	23.1 (59)	17.9 (45)	3.0 (7.6)	0.1 (0.25)	0.0 (0.0)	0.0 (0.0)	0.0 (0.0)	0.0 (0.0)	0.1 (0.25)	8.1 (21)	22.3 (57)	102.0 (259)
Average extreme snow depth inches (cm)	9.2 (23)	8.6 (22)	9.3 (24)	1.5 (3.8)	0.0 (0.0)	0.0 (0.0)	0.0 (0.0)	0.0 (0.0)	0.0 (0.0)	0.0 (0.0)	3.3 (8.4)	6.4 (16)	13.8 (35)
Average precipitation days (≥ 0.01 in)	19.6	16.4	15.4	13.4	12.4	11.5	11.2	10.3	11.1	13.9	14.9	18.1	168.2
Average snowy days (≥ 0.1 in)	17.6	15.0	10.1	3.0	0.1	0.0	0.0	0.0	0.0	0.2	5.7	13.5	65.2
Average relative humidity (%)	74.0	74.1	71.0	67.0	67.2	69.4	69.7	74.3	76.8	74.5	76.3	77.5	72.6
Average dew point °F (°C)	16.3 (−8.7)	17.2 (−8.2)	25.0 (−3.9)	34.0 (1.1)	45.1 (7.3)	55.0 (12.8)	59.9 (15.5)	59.7 (15.4)	53.4 (11.9)	42.3 (5.7)	33.3 (0.7)	22.8 (−5.1)	38.7 (3.7)
Mean monthly sunshine hours	108.3	118.1	177.7	216.5	266.5	297.6	314.4	273.4	212.3	154.4	81.5	77.5	2,298.2
Percentage possible sunshine	37	40	48	54	59	65	68	63	57	45	28	28	52
Source: NOAA (relative humidity, dew point, and sun 1961–1990)

== Demographics ==
Historical population
Census	Pop.	Note	%±
1810	1,001		—
1820	1,502		50.0%
1830	9,207		513.0%
1840	20,191		119.3%
1850	36,403		80.3%
1860	48,204		32.4%
1870	62,386		29.4%
1880	89,366		43.2%
1890	133,896		49.8%
1900	162,608		21.4%
1910	218,149		34.2%
1920	295,750		35.6%
1930	328,132		10.9%
1940	324,975		−1.0%
1950	332,488		2.3%
1960	318,611		−4.2%
1970	296,233		−7.0%
1980	241,741		−18.4%
1990	231,636		−4.2%
2000	219,474		−5.3%
2010	210,565		−4.1%
2020	211,328		0.4%
2025 (est.)	206,108		−2.5%
Historical Population Figures; U.S. Decennial Census

As of the 2020 United States census, the population of Rochester was 211,328. Like most Rust Belt cities, the city has experienced a sustained population decline over the last 60 years. In 2020, for the first time in 200 years, Rochester dropped to the fourth most populous city in the state behind Yonkers. However, in 2020, an increase in the city's population was reported for the first time since the 1950 Census.

Historical racial composition	2020	2010	1990	1970	1950
White	35%	43.7%	61.1%	82.4%	97.6%
—Non-Hispanic	33%	37.6%	58.3%	80.2% (Note: From a 15% sample.)	n/a
Black or African American	38%	41.7%	31.5%	16.8%	2.3%
Hispanic or Latino (of any race)	19.8%	16.4%	8.7%	2.8%	(X)
Asian	3.9%	3.1%	1.8%	0.2%	−

=== 2020 census ===
Rochester city, New York – racial and ethnic composition Note: the US Census treats Hispanic/Latino as an ethnic category. This table excludes Latinos from the racial categories and assigns them to a separate category. Hispanics/Latinos may be of any race.
Race / ethnicity (NH = Non-Hispanic)	Pop 2000	Pop 2010	Pop 2020	% 2000	% 2010	% 2020
White alone (NH)	97,395	79,178	69,792	44.32%	37.60%	33.03%
Black or African American alone (NH)	82,267	83,346	80,459	37.43%	39.58%	38.07%
Native American or Alaska Native alone (NH)	809	666	490	0.37%	0.32%	0.23%
Asian alone (NH)	4,867	6,350	8,403	2.21%	3.02%	3.98%
Pacific Islander alone (NH)	61	77	62	0.03%	0.04%	0.03%
Some Other Race alone (NH)	474	392	1,004	0.22%	0.19%	0.48%
Mixed-race or multiracial (NH)	5,868	6,100	9,249	2.67%	2.90%	4.38%
Hispanic or Latino (any race)	28,032	34,456	41,869	12.75%	16.36%	19.81%
Total	219,773	210,565	211,328	100.00%	100.00%	100.00%

As of the 2020 Census, 38.0% of Rochester residents were non-Hispanic Black, 33.0% were non-Hispanic White, 19.8% were Hispanic/Latino, 3.9% were Asian, 0.2% were Native American or Pacific Islander, and 5.1% were mixed or other.

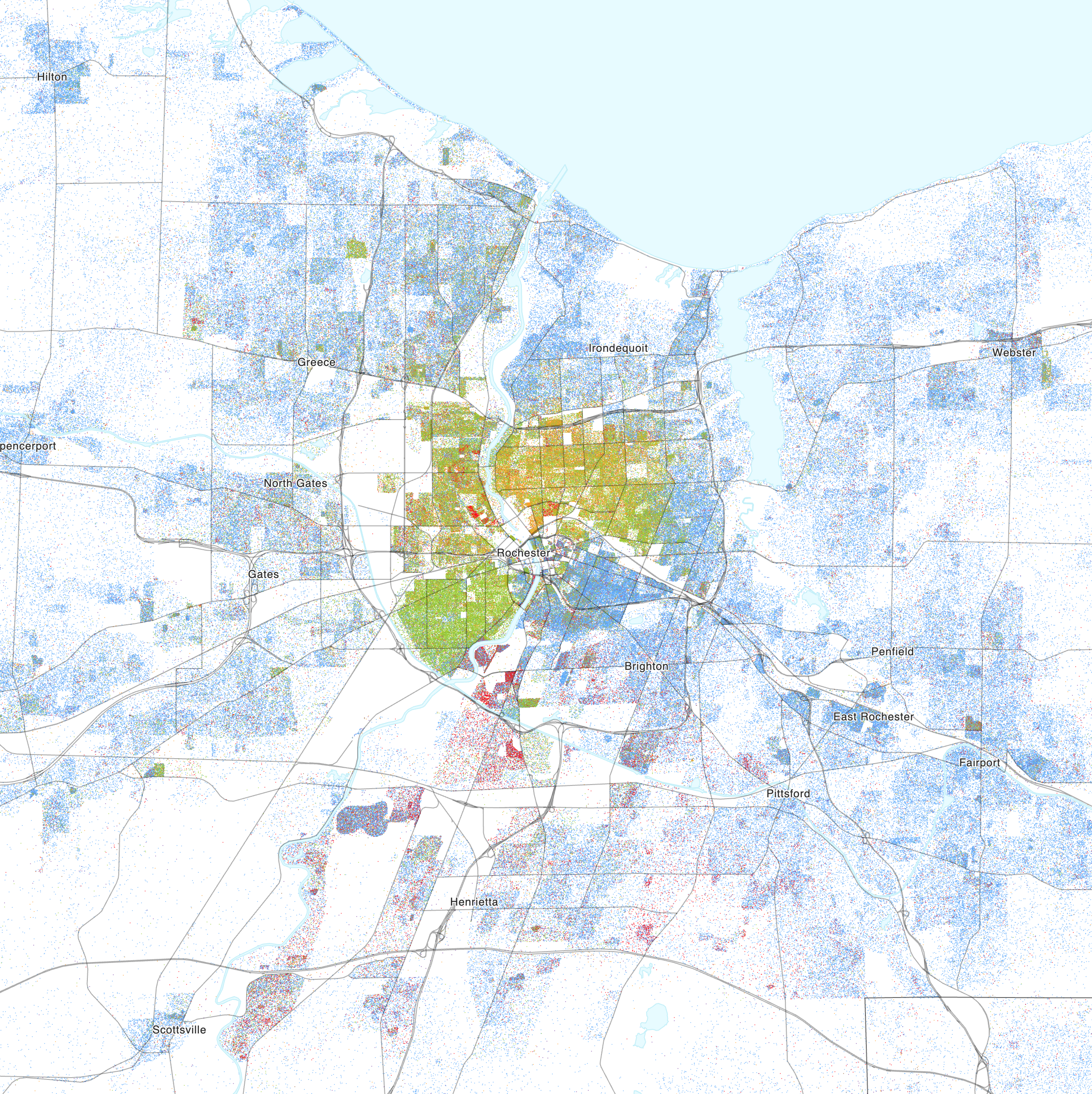
Map of racial distribution in Rochester, NY 2020 U.S. Census. Each dot is one person. ⬤ White ⬤ Black ⬤ Asian ⬤ Hispanic ⬤ Multiracial ⬤ Native American/other

In 2020, there were 91,500 households, of which 18.8% were married couples living together, 9.9% were unmarried co-habitating couples, 42.3% had a female householder with no partner present, and 29.0% had a male householder with no partner present. Of all households, 41.3% were made up of individuals, 25.3% had children under 18 living with them, and 9.2% had someone living alone 65 or older. 33.1% of housing units were owner-occupied, and 66.9% were rented. The age distribution was 18.8% under 18, 15.4% from 18 to 24, 30.8% from 25 to 44, 22.6% from 45 to 64, and 12.4% who were 65 or older. The median age was 32.9. For every 100 females, there were 93.6 males.

According to 2020 American Community Survey estimates, The median income for a city household was $37,395, and for a family was $43,873. Males had a median income of $30,379, versus $28,260 for females. The per capita income for the city was $24,916. About 25.5% of families and 30.4% of the population were below the poverty line, including 48.2% of those under age 18 and 17.3% of those age 65 or over.

Although losing population since 1950, over the course of the past 70 years Rochester has become a major center for immigration, particularly for arrivals from Eastern and Southeastern Europe, sub-Saharan Africa, and the Caribbean. Rochester had the highest percentage of Puerto Ricans of any major city in the United States in 2013, one of the four largest Turkish American communities, one of the largest Jamaican American communities in any major U.S. city and a large concentration of Polish Americans along with nearby Buffalo, New York. Rochester's Bhutanese and Nepalese communities are among the largest in the United States, concentrated primarily in Jones Square and Edgerton with growth fueled by recently arrived migrants and refugees. In addition, Rochester was ranked number 9 in the nation for the largest Italian population in the United States in 2018.

Rochester has been reported to have the largest per capita deaf population in the United States by The New York Times because it is home to the National Technical Institute for the Deaf. A 2012 report by the NTID concluded 3.7% of the Rochester metropolitan area is deaf or hard-of-hearing, compared to a national rate of 3.5%. Rochester has the largest deaf and hard-of-hearing population per capita when analyzing the working-age population, but may not have the largest per capita deaf population among all cities, due to deafness being much more prevalent in the elderly.

== Economy ==
Top private-sector Rochester area employers, 2024 Source: The City of Rochester, New York
Rank	Employer	Employees
1	University of Rochester	32,100
2	Rochester Regional Health	17,592
3	Wegmans	12,946
4	Paychex	4,579
5	Rochester Institute of Technology	4,155
6	L3Harris Technologies	3,724
7	Heritage Christian Services	2,456
8	Finger Lakes Health	2,308
9	Lifetime Healthcare Companies (Note: Including Excellus BlueCross BlueShield.)	2,298
10	Tops Markets	2,038

Like many Rust Belt cities, Rochester was traditionally a manufacturing center, home to companies such as Bausch & Lomb, Kodak, and Xerox. In the 21st century, deindustrialization has occurred. Xerox and Kodak each laid off thousands of workers in the 1990s and 2000s, causing the University of Rochester to become the city's top employer in 2005, a title it holds today. Bausch & Lomb moved to Bridgewater, New Jersey, in 2014. The Gannett newspaper company and Western Union were founded in Rochester by Frank Gannett and Hiram Sibley, respectively, but have since moved to other cities. Today, the city's top employers are its educational and medical institutions. After the University of Rochester, major employers in these fields include Rochester Regional Health, the Rochester Institute of Technology, and Carestream Health. In recent years, a high technology industry has grown in Rochester, fostered in part by collaborations between private startup enterprises and the local higher learning institutions. Other organizations such as High Tech Rochester provide local startups with mentorship, office space, and other resources. Like its legacy manufacturers, Rochester's modern technological focus is on imaging and optical science among the industry and universities. The Institute of Optics of the University of Rochester and the Rochester Institute of Technology have popular imaging programs, and a research hub for photonics has operated in the city since 2015 following federal and state investment. Rochester is also home to the Fortune 500 beverage company Constellation Brands and the Fortune 1000 company Paychex (Fortune #681) and the supermarket chain Wegmans. The median single-family house price was $247,000 in the third quarter of 2023 in greater Rochester, an increase of 10.3% from a year earlier, according to the National Association of Realtors.

== Arts and culture ==
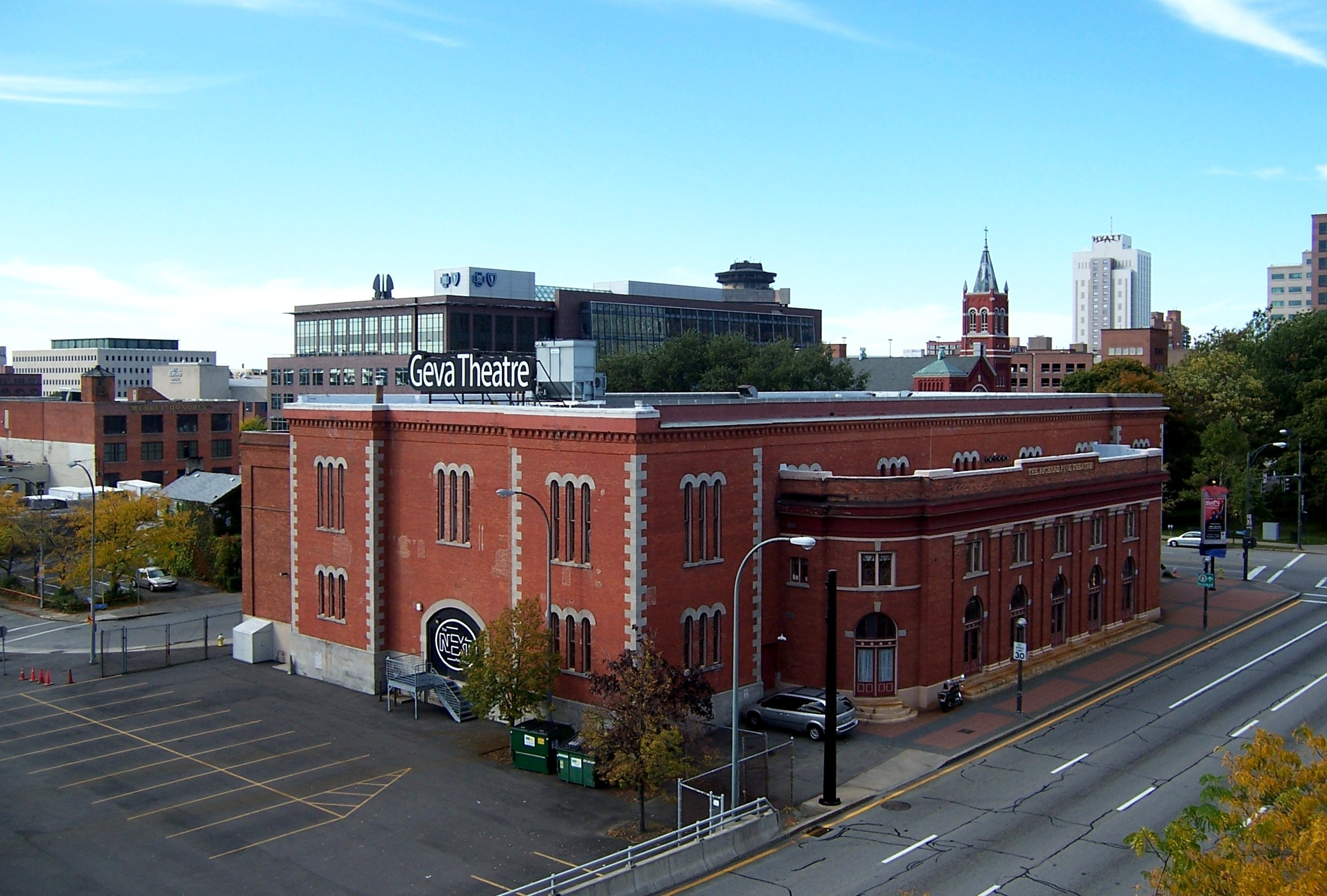
Geva Theatre Center in downtown Rochester

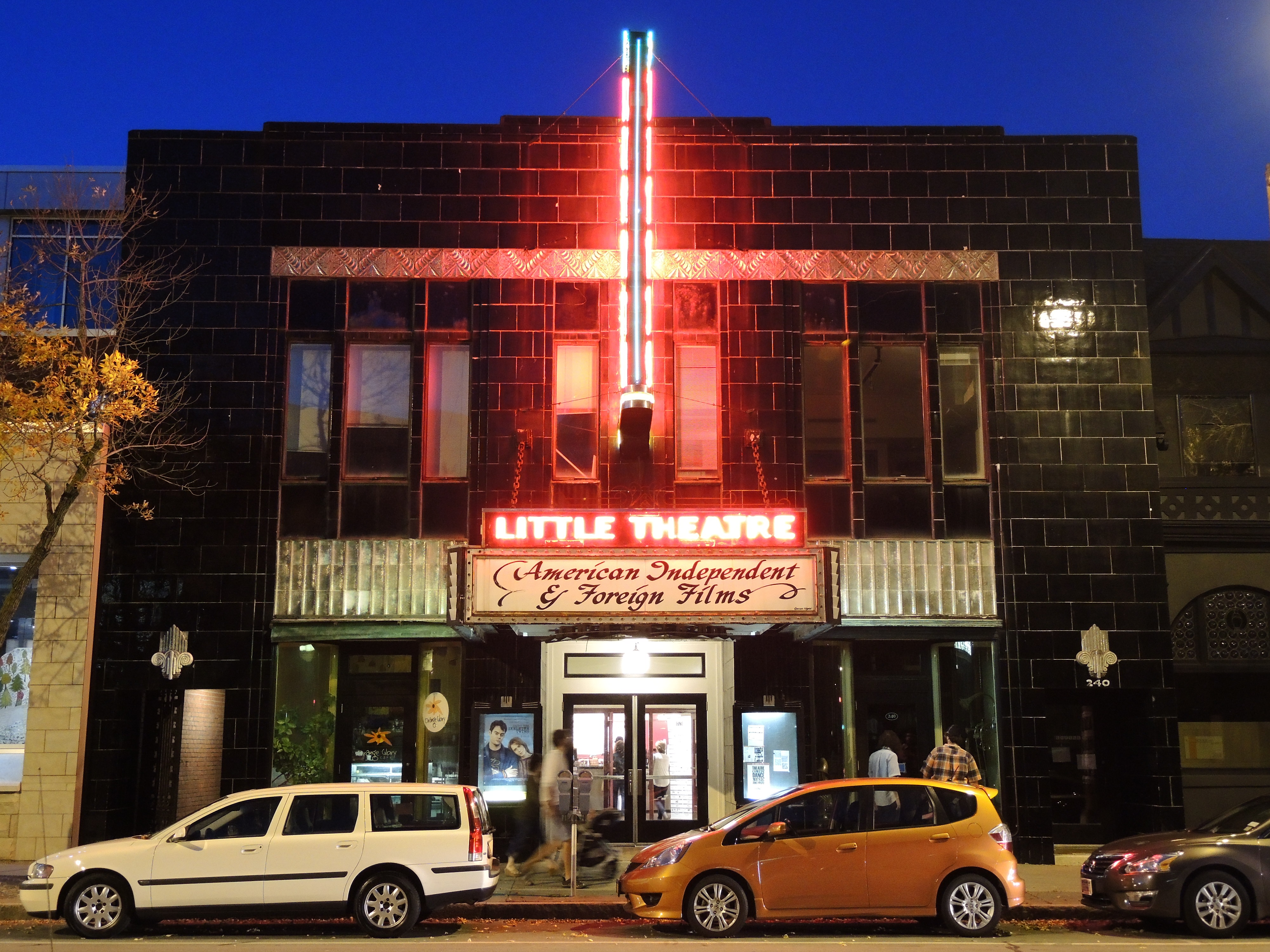
The Little Theatre in the East End

The city of Rochester is home to numerous cultural institutions. These include the Garth Fagan Dance, the Rochester Philharmonic Orchestra, the Rochester City Ballet, Rochester Contemporary Art Center, the Rochester Broadway Theater League, Hochstein School of Music & Dance, the Auditorium Theater, and numerous arts organizations. Geva Theatre Center is the city's largest professional theater. The East End Theater is on East Main Street in the theater district. The Eastman School of Music, one of the top musical institutes in the nation, and its auditorium are also within the East End neighborhood. The Eastman Theatre is host to the Rochester Philharmonic Orchestra and other musical/drama events.The Rochester Association of Performing Arts is a non-profit organization that provides educational theater classes to the community.

=== Architecture ===
Several churches are among Rochester's architectural features, including Asbury First United Methodist Church, St. Joseph's Church and Rectory, and the First Unitarian Church of Rochester, which was designed by Louis Kahn and described by Paul Goldberger as one of "the most significant works of religious architecture of the century". Significant Art Deco buildings include the Cinema Theater and Times Square Building, noted for its 42' tall "Wings of Progress" sculpture. The Midtown Plaza, the nation's first downtown shopping mall, first opened in 1962, and remains partially standing today.

=== Museums ===
Museums in the Rochester area include the Genesee Country Village and Museum, George Eastman Museum, Memorial Art Gallery, Rochester Museum and Science Center, Strasenburgh Planetarium, Susan B. Anthony House, New York Museum of Transportation, Rochester & Genesee Valley Railroad Museum, The Strong National Museum of Play, and ARTISANworks. In 2023, plans were announced for a museum dedicated to the life of Frederick Douglass in the city.

=== Festivals ===
Rochester hosts a number of cultural festivals every year. The Lilac Festival at Highland Park is attended by hundreds of thousands annually. Established after an 1898 gathering, it features the largest collection of lilac varieties in North America, a parade, and dozens of musical acts and food vendors. The Rochester International Jazz Festival was established in 2002 and is one of the largest jazz festivals in the United States. It takes place in late June at dozens of clubs, concert halls and free outdoor stages throughout Downtown Rochester, regularly drawing over 200,000 visitors. Other notable annual festivals in Rochester include the Rochester International Film Festival in June, the Corn Hill Arts Festival in July, and the Rochester Fringe Festival in September.

=== Cuisine ===
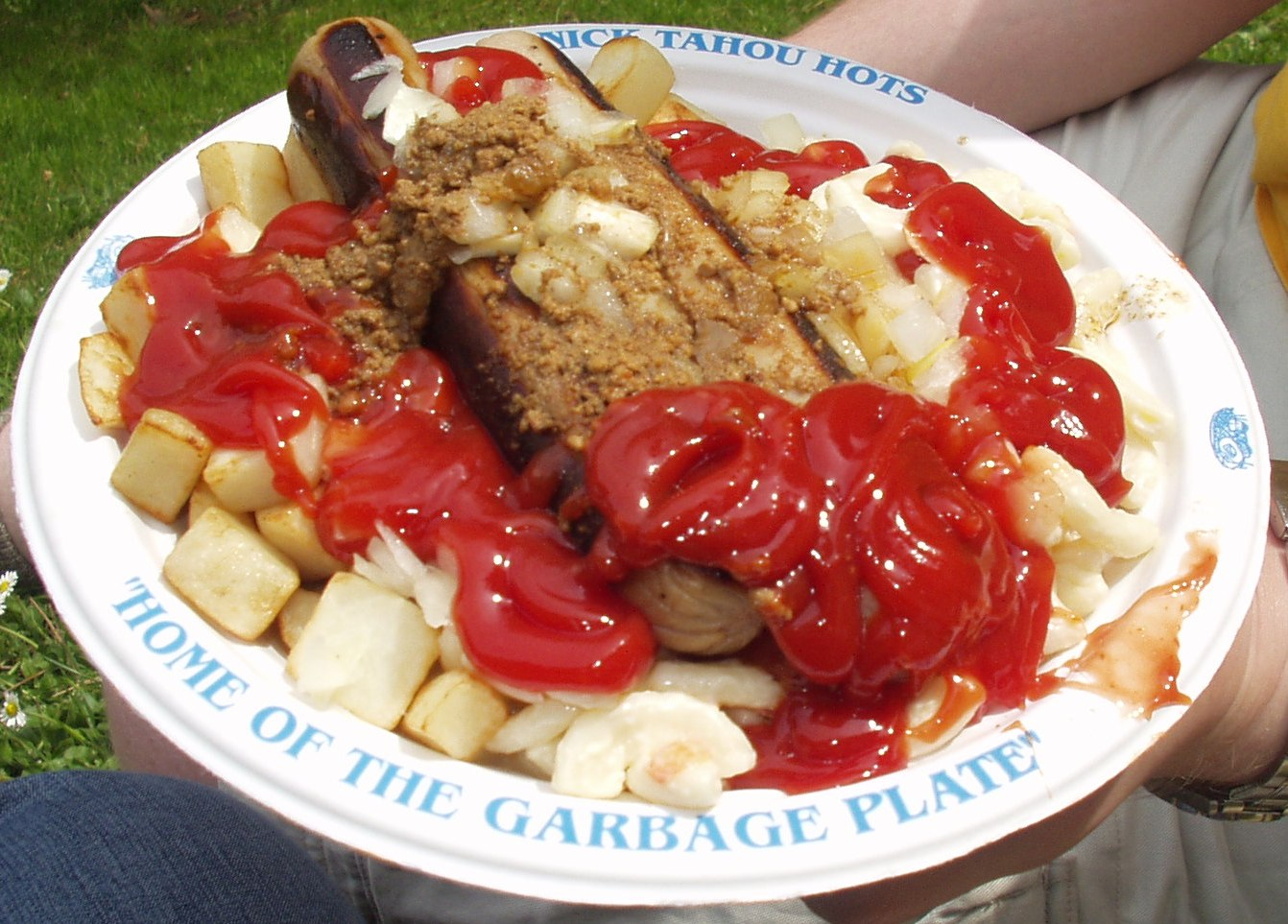
A white hot Garbage Plate from Nick Tahou Hots

One food product Rochester calls its own is the "white hot", a variant of the hot dog or smoked bratwurst made by the company Zweigle's and other local food manufacturers. Another local specialty is the Garbage Plate, a trademark of Nick Tahou Hots that traditionally includes macaroni salad, home fries, and two hot dogs or cheeseburgers topped with mustard, onions, and their famous meat hot sauce. Many area restaurants feature copies or variations with the word "plate" commonly used as a general term. Chicken Francese was first popularized by Rochester's Italian American community.

The Genesee Brewing Company is headquartered in Rochester, where it holds an annual December tradition of assembling a tower of beer kegs in the shape of a Christmas tree. Other local franchises include Abbott's Frozen Custard, Bill Gray's, DiBella's, and Tom Wahl's. Dinosaur Bar-B-Que, which originated in Syracuse, also operates its second franchise downtown in the former Lehigh Valley Railroad station on the Genesee River. The Ragú brand of pasta sauce used to be produced in Rochester. Some of the original facility still exists and produces products for other labels (including Newman's Own) as Private Label Foods. Rochester was also the original home of French's Mustard, whose address was 1 Mustard Street.

== Sports ==
=== Professional sports ===
Rochester has several professional sports teams:

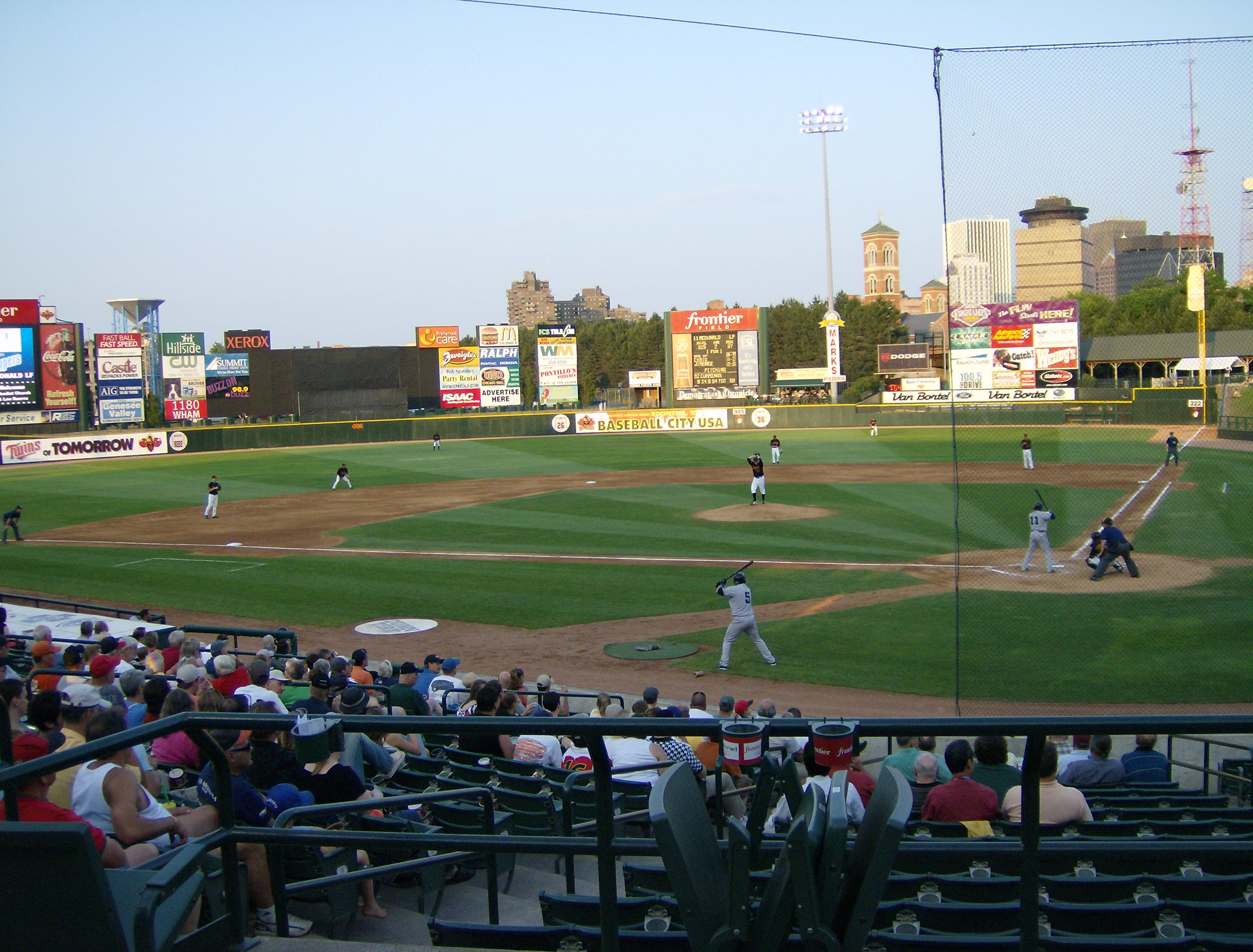
Frontier Field, including the Rochester skyline

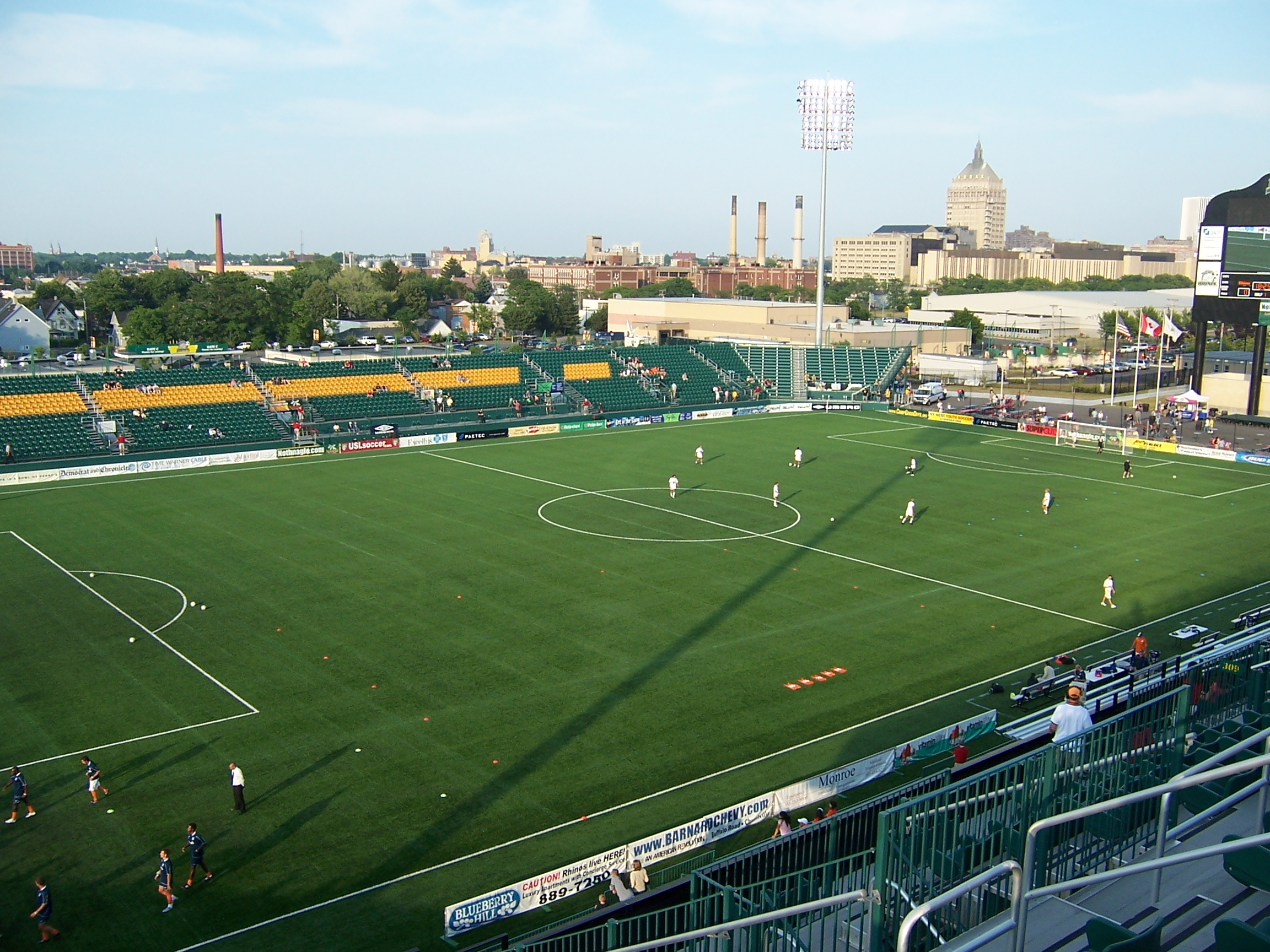
Rochester Community Sports Complex Stadium

Club	Sport	Began play	League	Venue	Titles
Rochester Red Wings	Baseball	1899	IL	ESL Ballpark	20
Rochester Americans	Ice hockey	1956	AHL	Blue Cross Arena	6
Rochester Knighthawks	Indoor lacrosse	2019	NLL	Blue Cross Arena	0
Flower City Union	Soccer	2021	NPSL	Rochester Community Sports Complex Stadium	1

The Rochester Royals (now the Sacramento Kings) were a professional basketball team in Rochester from 1945 to 1957 with roots as an amateur team dating back to 1923. They won the NBA title in 1951, defeating the New York Knicks in seven games. Rochester and its surrounding area also has a rich golf history and has hosted numerous professional tournaments on its local golf courses, most recently the 2023 PGA Championship.

=== Collegiate ===
NCAA Division I teams include the RIT men's and women's ice hockey teams, and the University of Rochester men's squash team, which has ranked top 5 in Division I.

== Parks and recreation ==
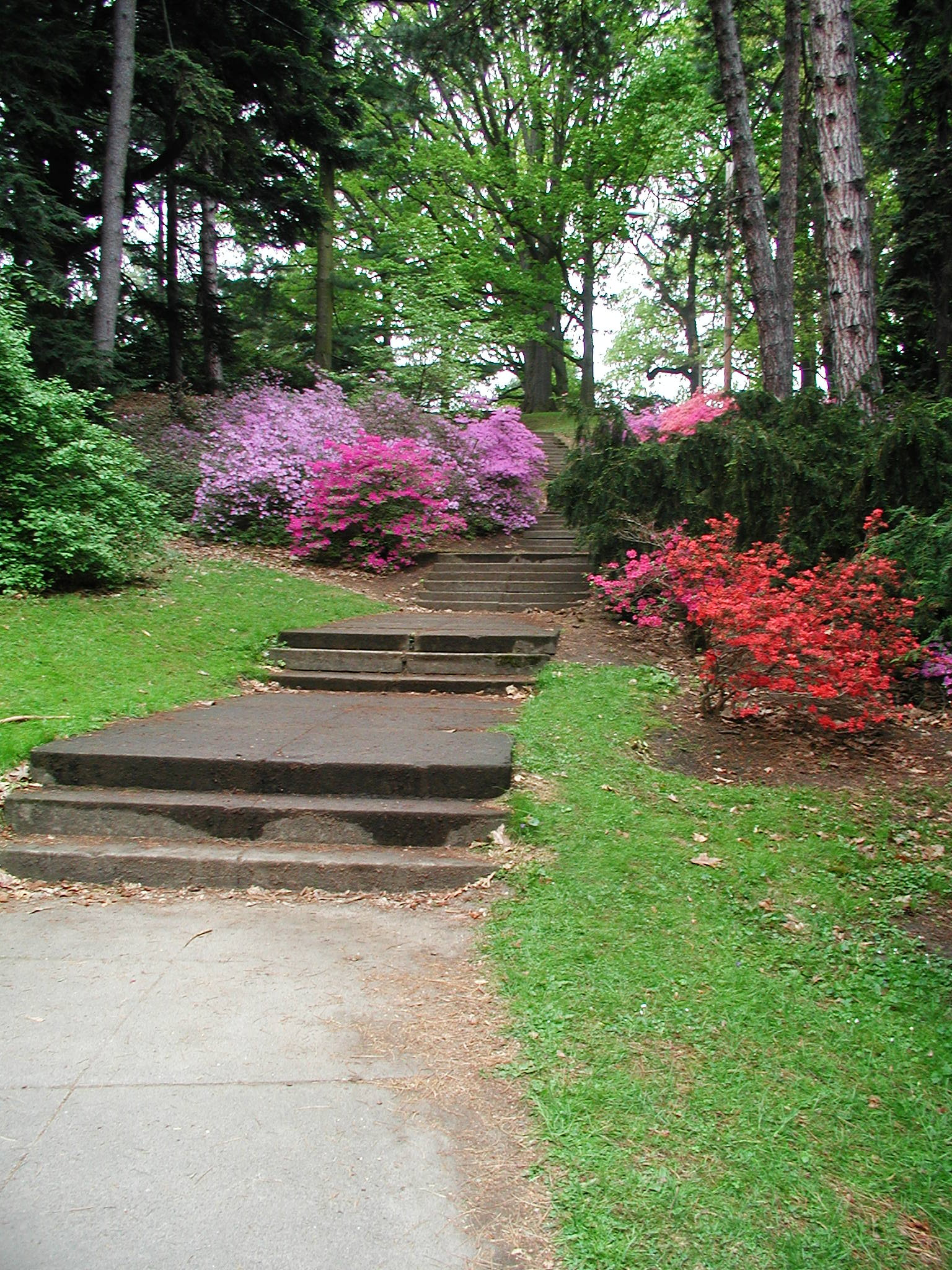
Highland Park

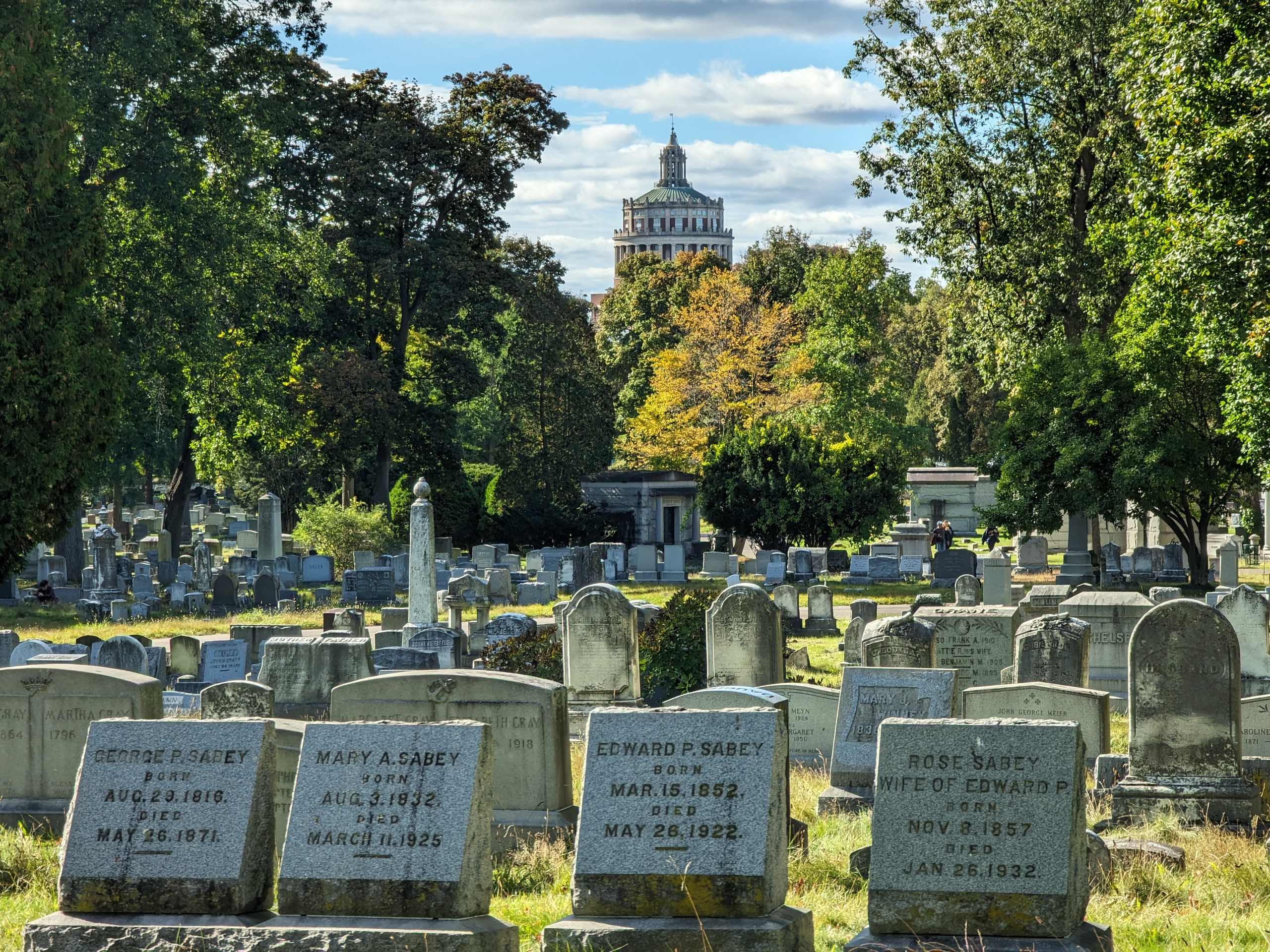
Mount Hope Cemetery

Notable cemeteries include the Victorian-era Mount Hope Cemetery, Holy Sepulchre and Riverside Cemetery. Mount Hope became a popular picnicking destination during the late nineteenth century, and the city began to develop public parks. Rochester's park system was initially designed by landscape architect Frederick Law Olmsted in the 1890s. Olmsted intended to preserve natural landscapes for the city residents to enjoy. The system included four major parks: Genesee Valley Park, Highland Park, Maplewood Park, and Seneca Park, the last of which is today home to the Seneca Park Zoo.

The park system was expanded in the early twentieth century with Cobb's Hill Park and Durand Eastman Park in 1908, Edgerton Park in 1911, and Ontario Beach Park in the early 1920s. The Park Commission also constructed new facilities in all parks, filling them with playgrounds, pavilions, and sports facilities. Modern additions to the park system include Martin Luther King Jr. Memorial Park, Turning Point Park, and Tryon Park, which are located on former industrial and urban sites, in contrast to the early parks. Most of the city's parks lie on the Genesee River and can be accessed by the Genesee Riverway Trail, which runs for the river's entire length through the city. Current city facilities include 12 full-time recreation centers, 48 playgrounds, two artificial ice rinks, 74 softball/baseball fields, 42 tennis courts, four soccer fields, and 45 outdoor basketball courts.

== Government ==
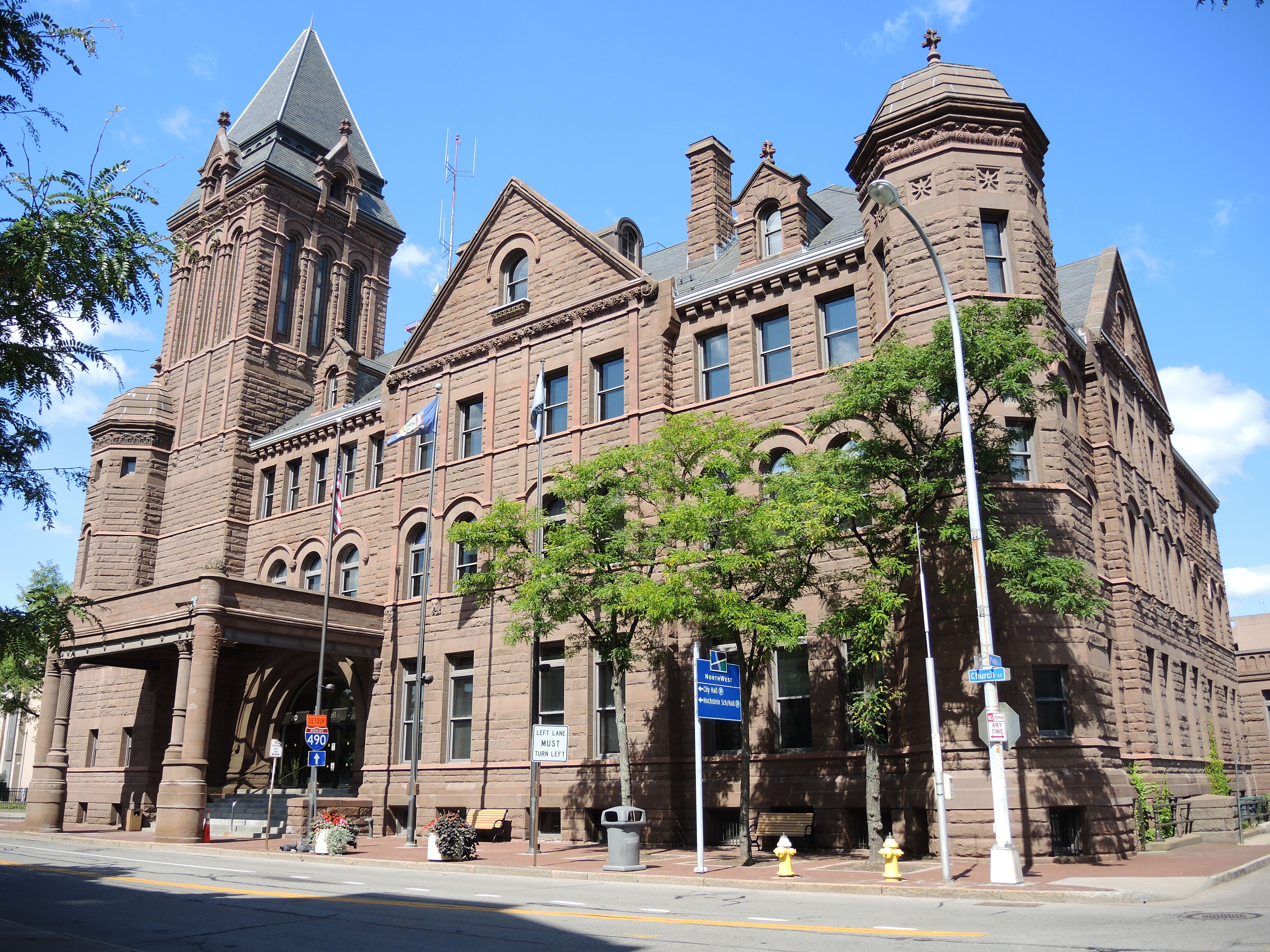
Rochester City Hall

Rochester is governed by a mayor serving as chief executive of city government and a city council consisting of four district members and five at-large members. Rochester has had a Strong mayor-council form of government since the approval of its current charter in a referendum in 1984. Administrative officers are appointed by the mayor and confirmed by the city council. All city legislation is proposed and passed by the council, and subject to a veto by the mayor, unless a majority of two-thirds approved it. The current mayor is Malik Evans, serving since January 1, 2022.

Upon the city's charter in 1834, the mayor had few powers and most power was vested in the city council, which was composed of alderman representing individual wards. The charter was frequently modified during the 19th century to expand or reduce the mayor's powers, until an 1898 act by the New York State Legislature centralized all appointments under the mayor. The city abolished the mayor's office and adopted a city manager system in a 1925 referendum, after which the mayor became a minor position and the city manager assumed executive authority, with both being chosen by the members of the city council. A 1984 referendum restored the Strong mayor system. William A. Johnson, the city's first African American mayor, served from 1994 to 2005. Lovely Warren, the city's first female mayor, served from 2014 to 2021.

=== Federal representation ===
The city is covered by New York's 25th congressional district currently represented by Democrat Joe Morelle of Irondequoit, Monroe County, in Congress. From 1987 until 2018, the city was represented by longtime Democrat Louise M. Slaughter of Fairport, Monroe County, in Congress.

=== State representation ===
After redistricting based on the 2020 United States census, the city was split between two state senate districts:

District	Area of the city	Senator	Party	First took office	Residence
55	Eastern	Samra Brouk	Democratic	2021	Rochester, Monroe County
56	Western	Jeremy Cooney	Democratic	2021	Rochester, Monroe County

After redistricting based on the 2020 census, the city was split between three state assembly districts:

District	Areas of the city	Assemblyperson	Party	First took office	Residence
136	Brighton, Irondequoit, northwest portion and easternmost tip of the City of Rochester	Sarah Clark	Democratic	2020	Rochester, Monroe County
137	Gates, center of the City of Rochester	Demond Meeks	Democratic	2020	Rochester, Monroe County
138	Chili, Henrietta, Riga, and the Southeast portion of the City of Rochester	Harry B. Bronson	Democratic	2011	Rochester, Monroe County

=== County representation ===
Rochester is represented by districts 7, 16, and 21–29 in the Monroe County legislature (a 29-seat body with legislators elected to two-year terms). Rochester is also under the jurisdiction of the county executive (currently Democrat Adam Bello) along with the rest of Monroe County. The District Attorney is also elected at the county level along with several other offices (such as Sheriff and Clerk) which in part govern the city.

=== Courts ===
Rochester is part of the 7th Judicial District of the New York Supreme Court and the 4th Department of the New York Supreme Court, Appellate Division.

==== Rochester City Court ====
Rochester City Court is part of the New York State Unified Court System and consists of ten full-time judges, each of whom is elected to a 10-year term. Each judge must be a city resident and must have been an attorney in New York for at least five years. Judges have a mandatory retirement age of 70. Vacancies on the court are filled by the mayor, and judges so appointed must run for a full term at the next general election.

In New York State, the 61 city courts outside of New York City handle the arraignment of felonies, try misdemeanors and lesser offenses, and try civil lawsuits involving claims of up to $15,000. Rochester City Court also hears small claims matters up to $5,000. Rules of practice and procedure within all city courts are prescribed by the Uniform City Court Act. Rochester City Court, like all city courts, follows the individual assignment system ("IAS"). This means that each case is assigned to a judge when the case is first initiated, and, with a few exceptions, stays under the supervision of that particular judge until the case is resolved.

Created in 1876, the court was initially named the "Municipal Court of the City of Rochester" and had two judges. Originally, city courts throughout the state were self-regulating, and prescribed their own rules of procedure and bounds of jurisdiction. Rochester City Court was governed by the Rochester City Court Act, which was a part of the Charter of the City of Rochester. In 1935, Judge Jacob Gitelman introduced weekend sentencing. He was the first judge in New York State to do so. In 1964, the New York State Constitution was amended to require uniform jurisdiction, practice, and procedure for the city courts, to be regulated by the state legislature. The court's first African-American judge, Reuben K. Davis, was appointed to the city court bench in March 1967.

In the 1980s, the court heard cases involving the prosecution of the "Topfree Seven", women who intentionally bared their chests once a year in order to protest the criminalization of female nudity. Judge Herman J. Walz ruled that the women could not be prosecuted under New York's public nudity statute because their act of going topless in order to protest the law was imbued with First Amendment protections. The decision was later affirmed by the New York Court of Appeals. By 1995, Rochester City Court had eight judges. A ninth was added in 2001. The court was brought to its current complement of ten judges in 2014.

== Education ==
=== Primary and secondary education ===
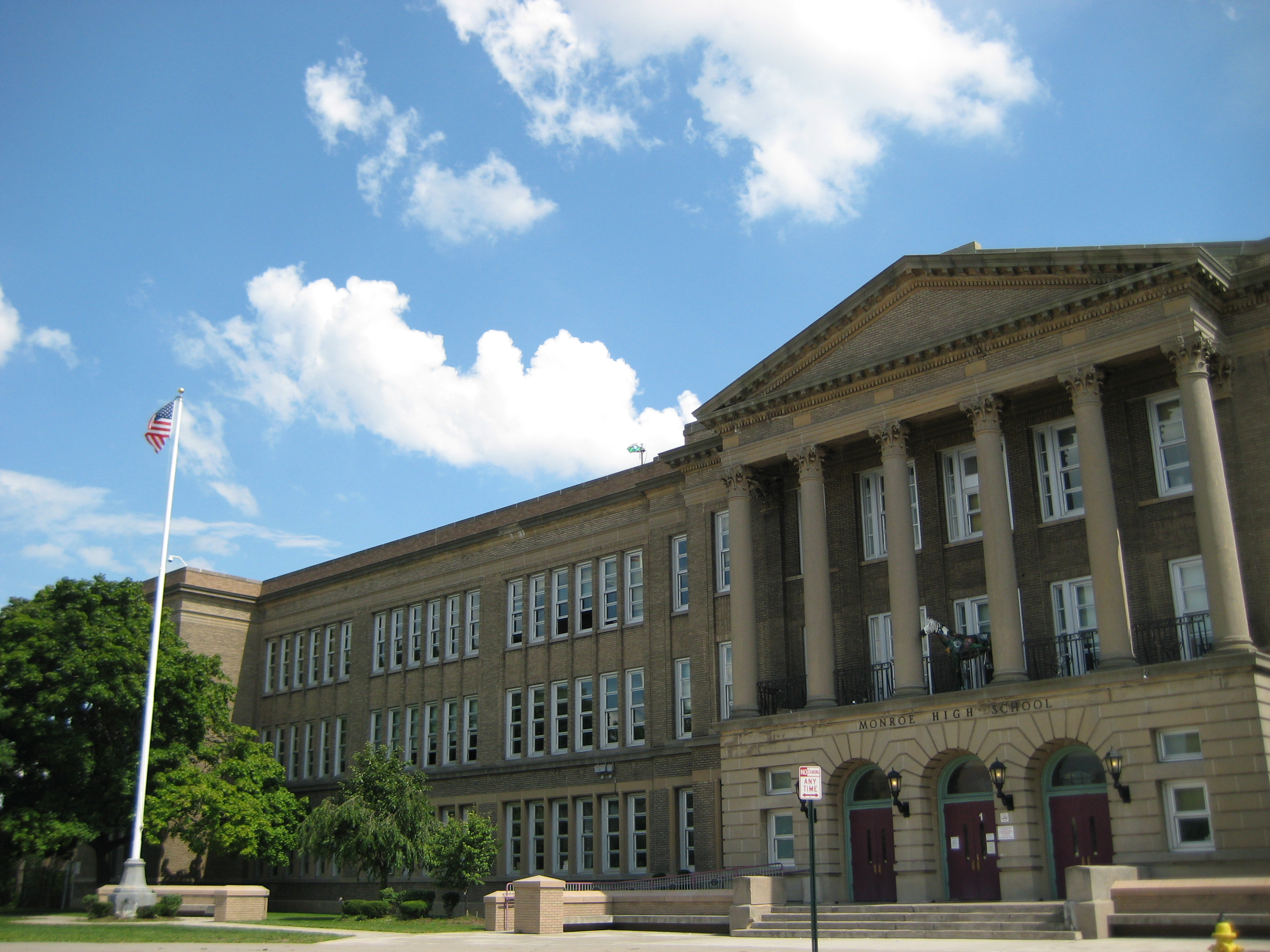
James Monroe High School

The City of Rochester is served by the Rochester City School District, which encompasses all public primary and secondary education. During the 2022–23 school year, 22,238 students were enrolled in the district, with an average expenditure per student of US$23,266 and a four-year graduation rate of 71%. The district is governed by a popularly elected seven-member board of education. The Rochester City School District operates 14 public secondary schools, each serving grades 7 through 12.

- Dr. Alice Holloway Young School of Excellence (7–8)
- East Lower School (6–8)
- East Upper School (9–12)
- Edison Career & Technology High School (9–12)
- Franklin Lower School (7–8)
- Franklin Upper School (9–12)
- James Monroe Lower School (7–8)
- James Monroe Upper School (9–12)
- Joseph C. Wilson Magnet High School (9–12)
- Northeast College Preparatory High School (9–12)
- Northwest Junior High at Douglass (7–8)
- Rochester Early College International High School (9–12)
- School of the Arts (7–12)
- School Without Walls (9–12)

For the 2022–23 school year, Rochester additionally had fourteen free charter schools serving grades Kindergarten through 12. Other private schools in and near Rochester include McQuaid Jesuit High School, Aquinas Institute and Bishop Kearny High School.

=== Colleges and universities ===
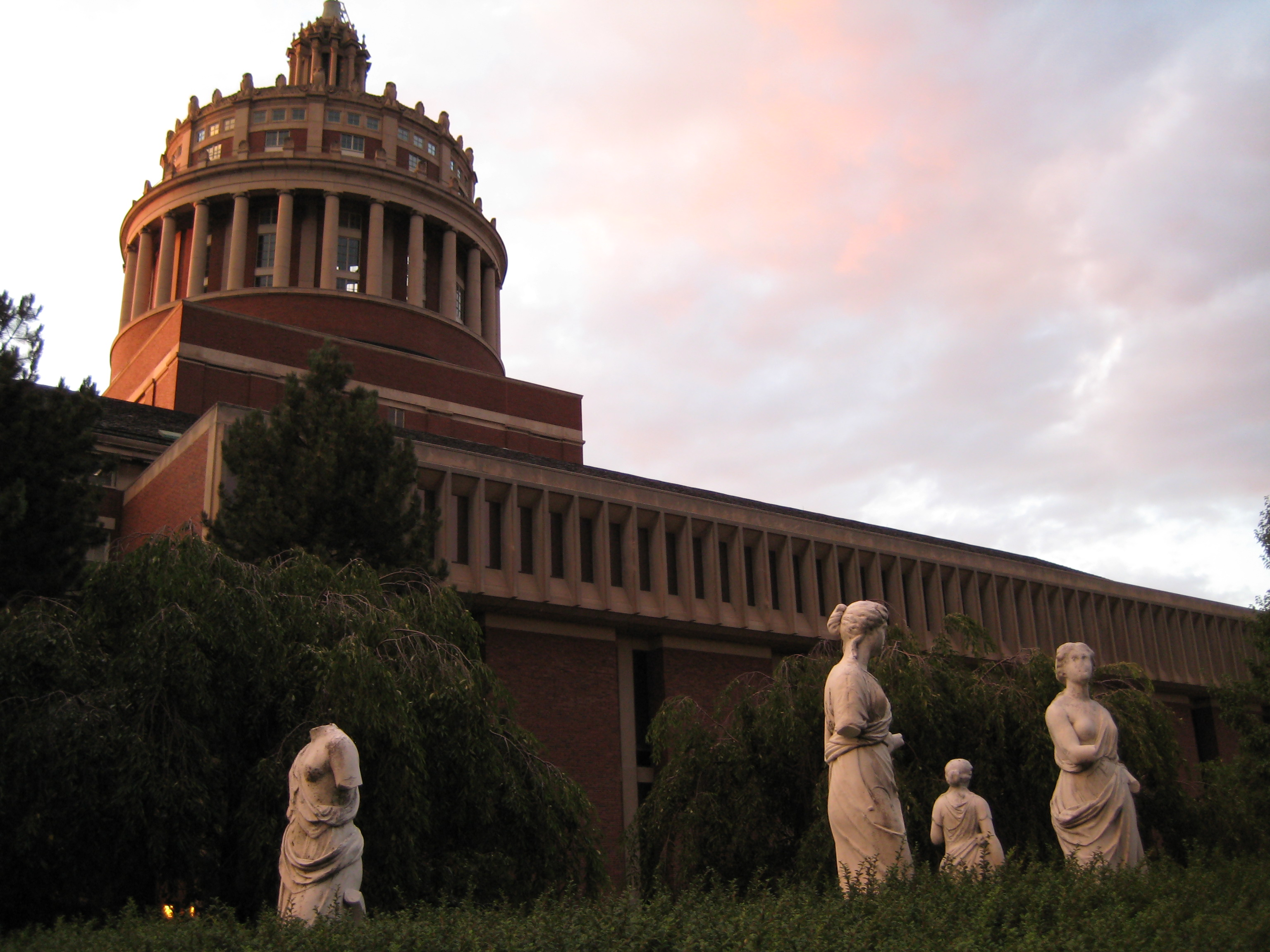
Rush Rhees Library at the University of Rochester

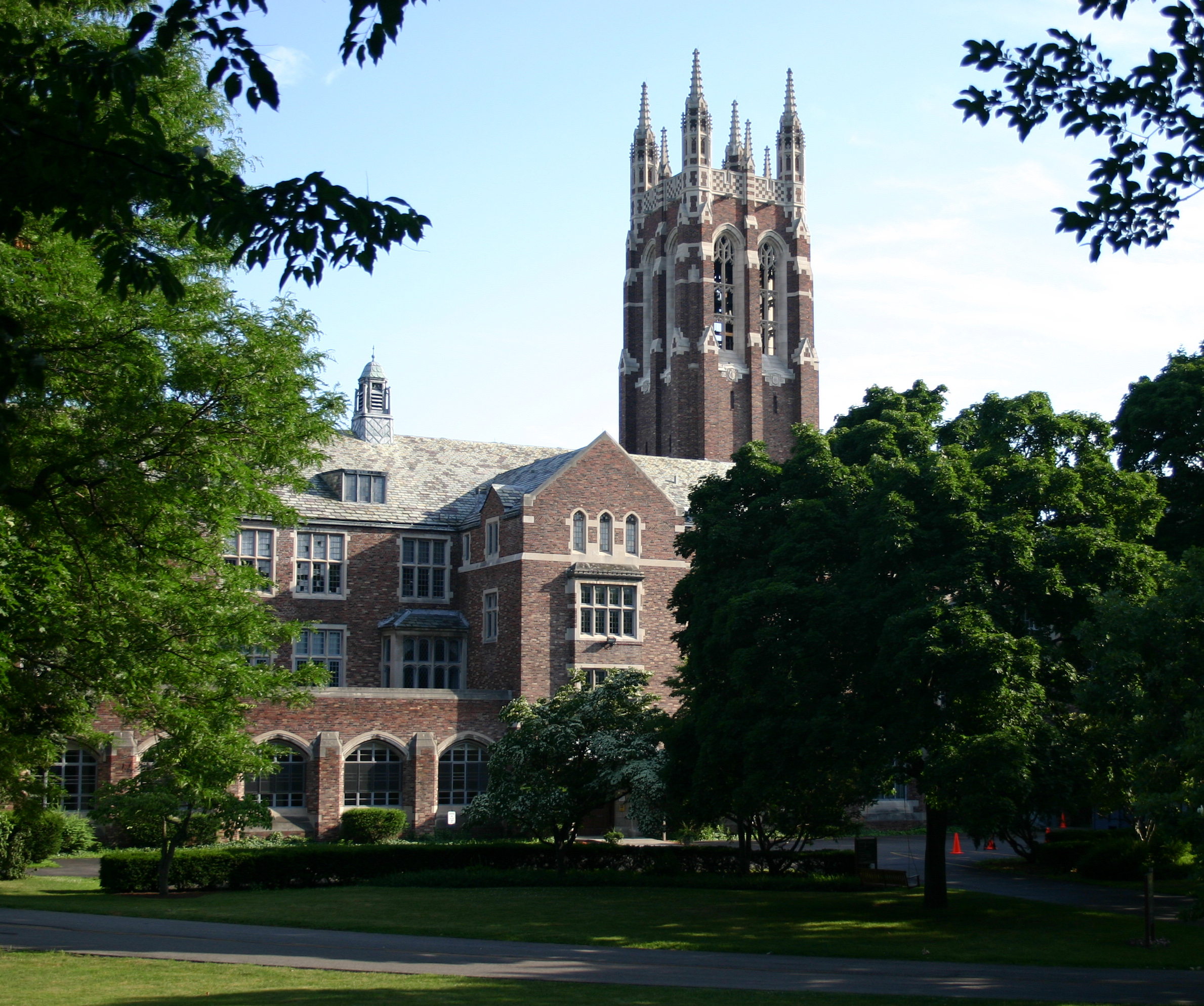
Colgate Rochester Crozer Divinity School

Rochester and the surrounding region host a high concentration of colleges and universities, which drive much of the economic growth in the five-county area. The University of Rochester is the only large research institution primarily within the city limits, although Monroe Community College and SUNY Brockport operate campuses downtown. The Highland Park neighborhood was home to Colgate Rochester Crozer Divinity School (part of whose facility is leased by Ithaca College's Department of Physical Therapy) and an office maintained by the Cornell University School of Industrial and Labor Relations.

The University of Rochester is the metropolitan area's oldest and most prominent institution of higher learning, and one of the country's top research centers. It includes a nursing school, the Simon School of Business, and the Eastman School of Music. It was founded and endowed by George Eastman in his years as a philanthropist. He also contributed greatly to the University of Rochester from wealth based on the success of Eastman Kodak.

Five institutions began operations in the city and later moved to Rochester's inner-ring suburbs: the Empire State University Rochester Learning Center, Monroe Community College, Rochester Institute of Technology, St. Bernard's School of Theology and Ministry and Nazareth University. Rochester was the host of the Barleywood Female University, a short-lived women's college from 1852 to 1853. The Lutheran seminary that became Wagner College was established in the city in 1883 and remained for some 35 years before moving to Staten Island.

=== Libraries ===
The Rochester Public Library is headquartered at the Central Library of Rochester & Monroe County, which is located in the Rundel Memorial Library building and the adjacent Bausch & Lomb Public Library Building in downtown Rochester. The city is part of the larger Monroe County Library System. Library cards are freely available to residents of Monroe County and valid at the eleven branch libraries in the city and other branches in the county. The library had 8.1 visits per capita and over 6,000 programs as of 2018.

== Media ==
The Democrat and Chronicle, a Gannett newspaper, is Rochester's main daily newspaper. Other local publications exist which cater to special interests, such as the Rochester Business Journal and the Minority Reporter. Former publications serving the city include Insider magazine, the Rochester Post Express, the Rochester Evening Journal, and the Times-Union.

Rochester is also served by several local television and radio stations, with WROC-TV as the oldest television station serving the Rochester metro area. The WXXI Public Broadcasting Council is a non-profit organization in Rochester which provides public television and community radio programs. WXXI owns or operates several radio stations, the television station WXXI-TV, the alternative weekly publication City Magazine, and the Little Theater.

Several movies have been filmed at least in part in Rochester, including The Amazing Spiderman 2 (2014) and The Tomorrow Man (2019).

== Infrastructure ==
=== Transportation ===
==== Maritime ====
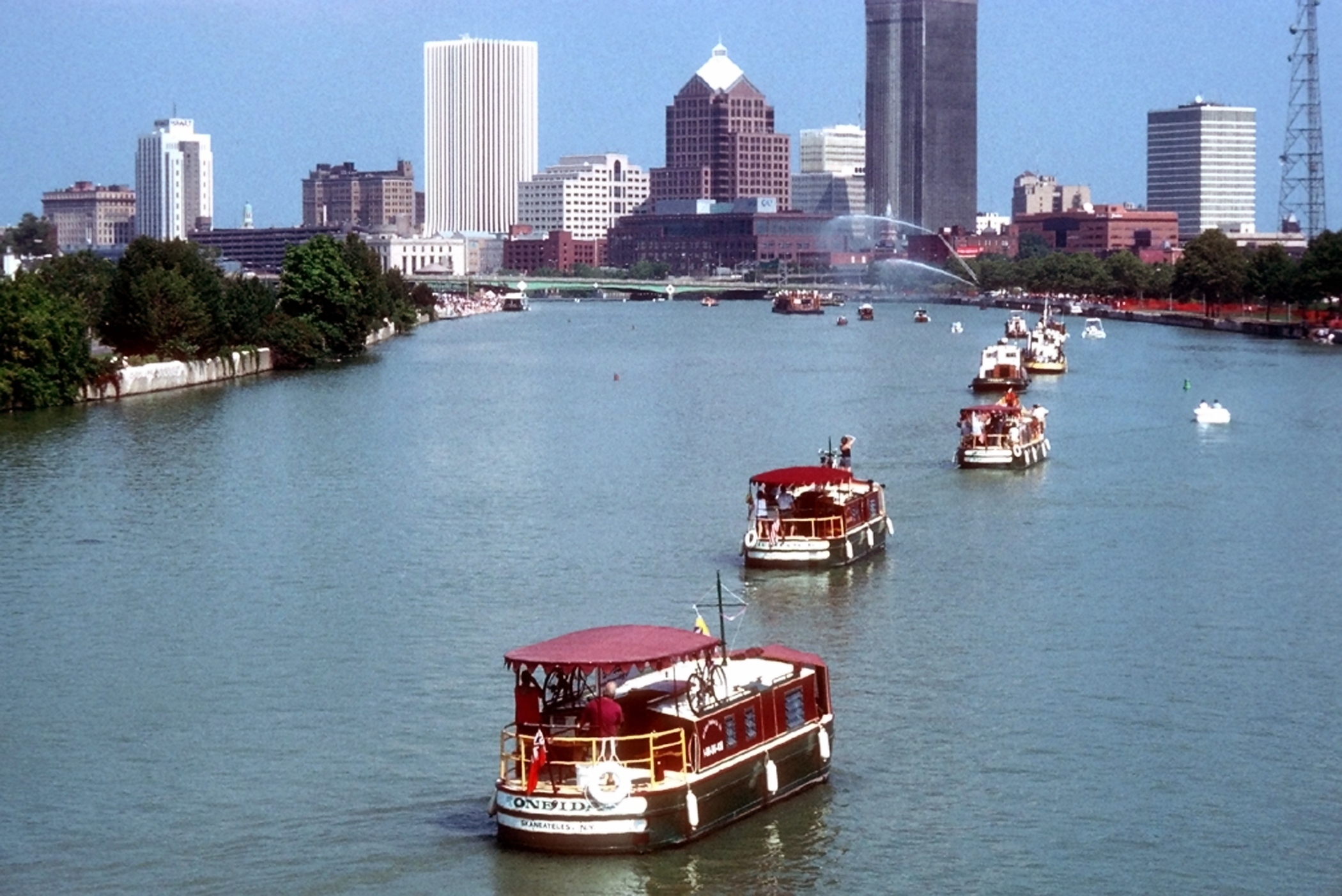
Packet boats on the Genesee River

There is marine freight service at the Port of Rochester on Lake Ontario, which is connected to the Atlantic Ocean via the Saint Lawrence Seaway. The Erie Canal intersects the Genesee River on the south side of the city.

During the 19th and early 20th centuries, a number of passenger ferries operated on Lake Ontario between the Port of Rochester and Canada. Service ended in 1950 when the Ontario I and Ontario II ended their route between Rochester and Cobourg. A new ferry, the Spirit of Ontario I, operated between Rochester and Toronto from June 17, 2004, to December 12, 2005. The ferry suffered from numerous issues, including two separate pier collisions that damaged it. The initial operator, Canadian American Transportation Systems (CATS), went bankrupt by the end of the 2004 season. The city of Rochester then purchased the ferry and signed a contract with Bay Ferries Great Lakes to resume operations in 2005. The resumption of service was delayed until summer, causing the ferry to continue to operate at a loss. In 2006, the operation was shut down and the ferry was sold.

==== Air ====
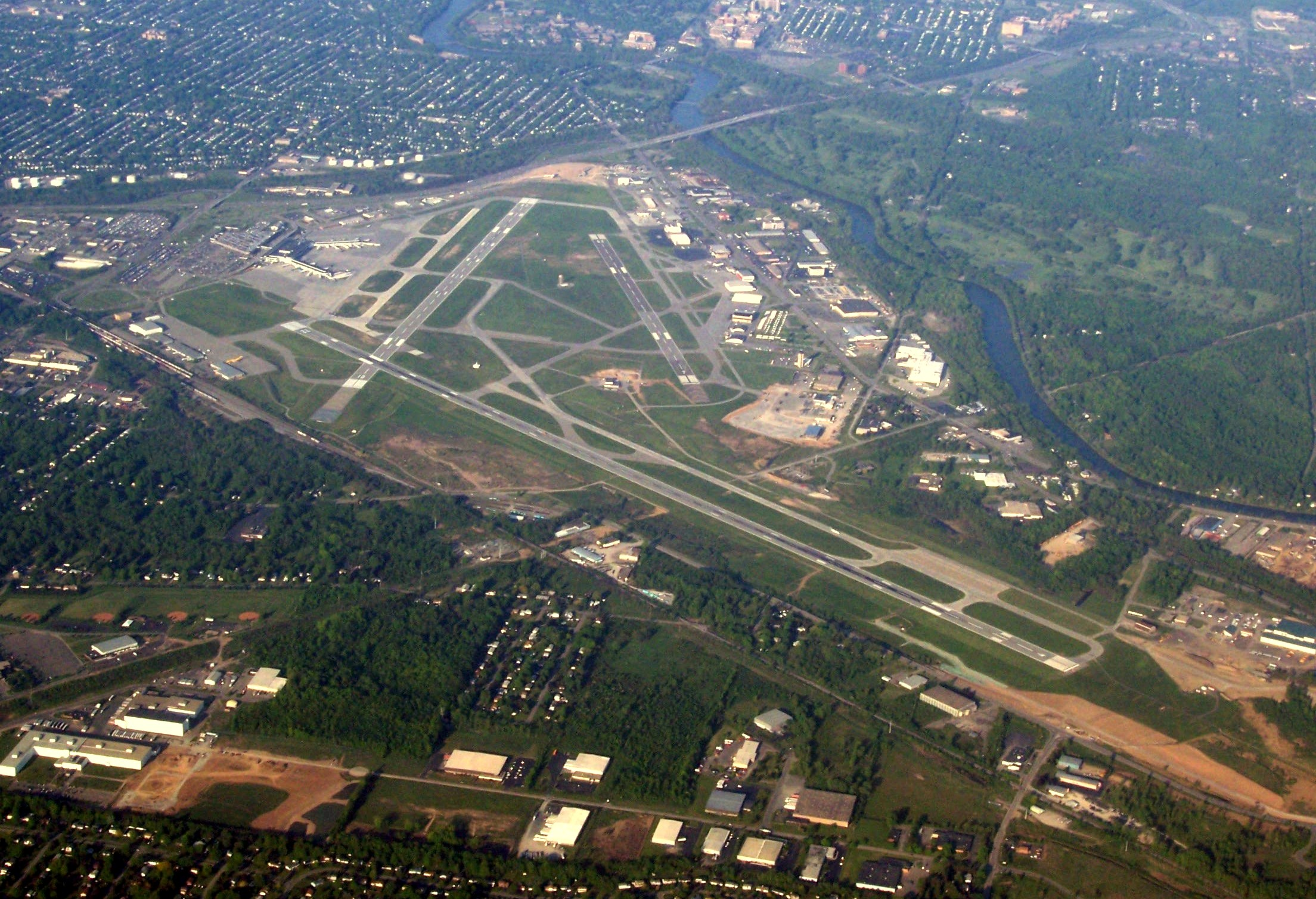
Aerial view of the Greater Rochester International Airport

Rochester is served by the Frederick Douglass Greater Rochester International Airport (GRIA). Scheduled air service is provided by American, Allegiant, Delta, Frontier, JetBlue, Southwest, Spirit, and United.

FedEx founder Fred Smith has stated in several articles that Xerox's development of the copier, and its need to quickly get parts to customers, was one of the economic issues that led him to pioneer the overnight delivery business in 1971. Because Xerox manufactured its copiers in Rochester, the city was one of the original 25 cities FedEx served on its first night of operations on April 17, 1973.

In 2016, Governor Andrew Cuomo announced a $63.4 million project to renovate the GRIA. The renovations include a large canopy extending over both main entrances, solar panels, a rainwater collection system, and modern communication and security enhancements. All construction was completed by October 2018.

==== Rails and mass transit ====
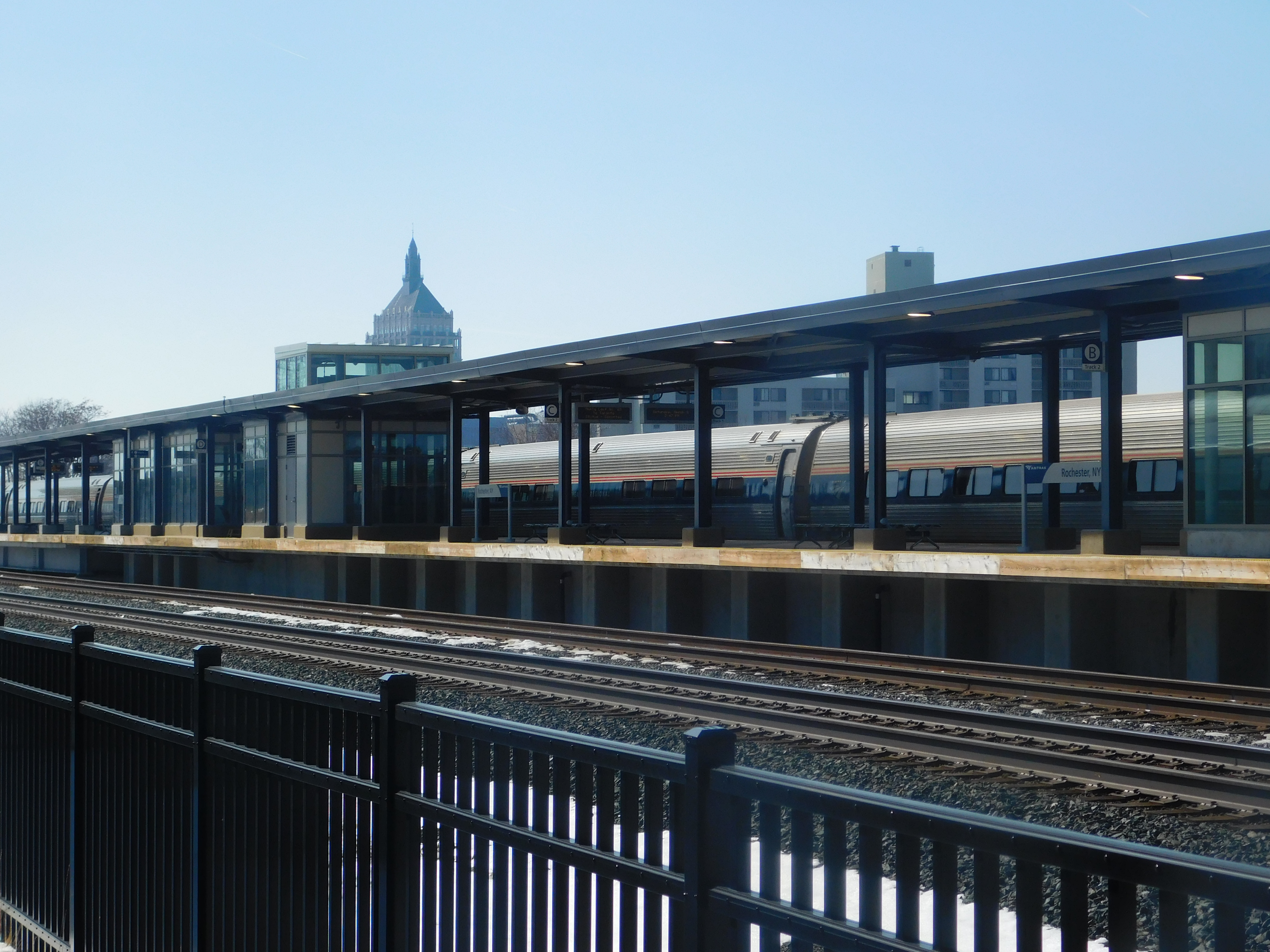
Platform at the Louise M. Slaughter Rochester Station

Local bus service in Rochester and its county suburbs is provided by the Rochester-Genesee Regional Transportation Authority (RGRTA) via its Regional Transit Service (RTS) subsidiary. RTS also provides suburban service outside the immediate Rochester area and runs smaller transportation systems in outlying counties, such as WATS (Wayne Area Transportation System). All RTS routes are based out of the RTS Transit Center on Mortimer Street. Rochester has intercity and transcontinental bus service via Greyhound and Trailways.

Rail service to Rochester is provided by the Louise M. Slaughter Rochester Station, served by Amtrak's Empire Service between New York City and Niagara Falls, the Maple Leaf between New York City and Toronto, and the Lake Shore Limited between New York City/Boston and Chicago. Prior to 1965, Rochester had a smaller station reminiscent of New York City's "Grand Central Terminal". It was among Claude Fayette Bragdon's best works in Rochester. The current station is modeled after Bragdon's work and named in honor of former longtime congresswoman Louise Slaughter.

Rochester used to be a major stop on several railroad lines. The New York Central Railroad provided service to Chicago and Buffalo to the west and Albany and New York City to the east and southeast. The Buffalo, Rochester and Pittsburgh Railway (absorbed by the Baltimore and Ohio Railroad) served Buffalo and Pittsburgh until 1955. A rail route to Salamanca in southern New York State afforded connections in Salamanca to southwestern and southeastern New York State. The last long-distance train was the Northern Express/Southern Express, operated by the Pennsylvania Railroad on the Genesee Valley Canal Railroad, that went to Harrisburg, Pennsylvania via Canandaigua, Elmira and Williamsport; service ended in 1971. Also serving Rochester were the Erie Railroad and Lehigh Valley Railroad.

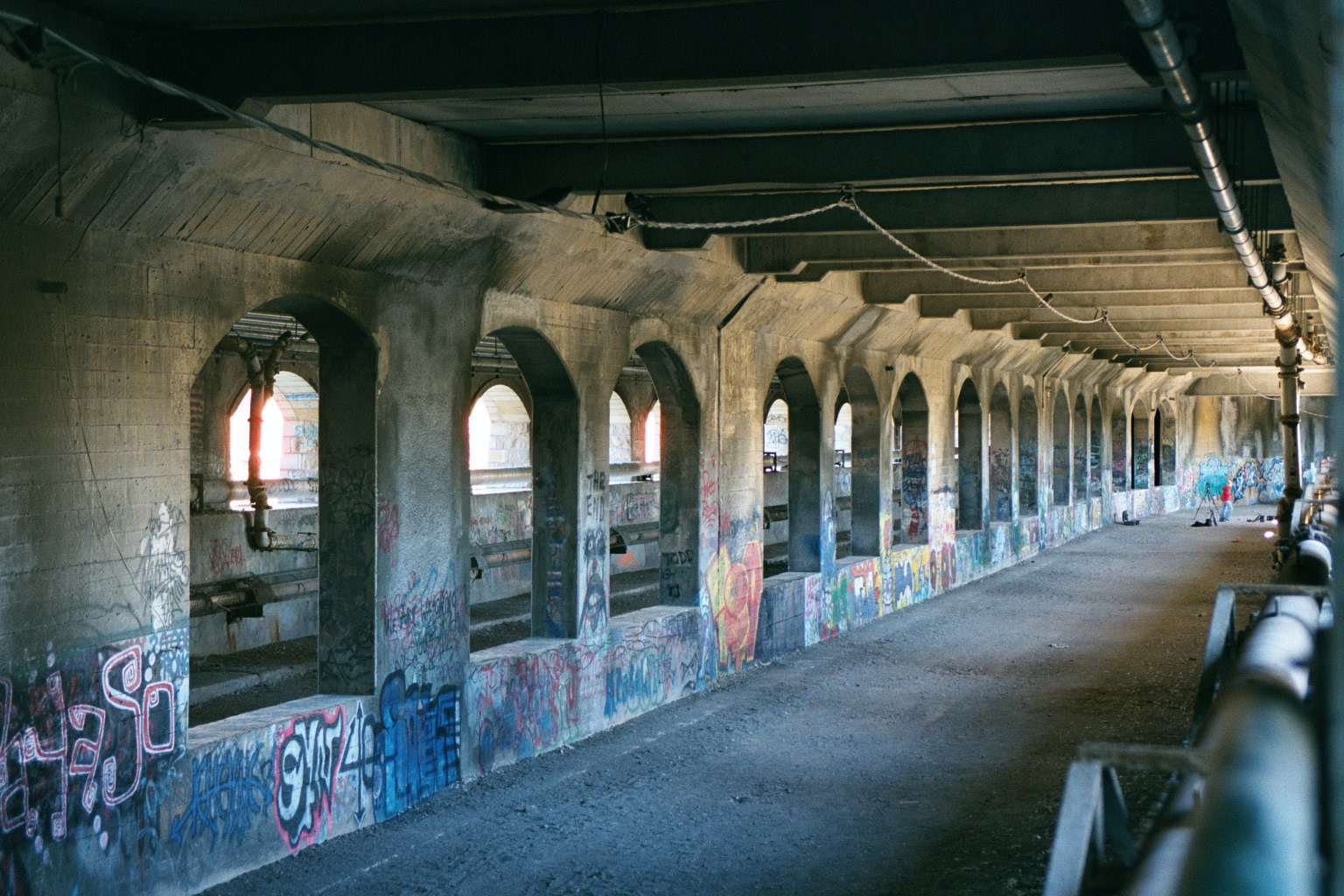
The Broad Street Aqueduct was used as a subway tunnel in the mid-20th century.

From 1927 to 1956, Rochester had a light rail underground transit system called the Rochester subway, which was first operated by New York State Railways and later by the Rochester Transit Corporation. Rochester was the smallest city in the world to have such a system. After the subway was shut down in 1956, the eastern half of the subway past Court Street became the Eastern Expressway, and the western end of the open cut was filled in 1976. The tunnel was last used for freight service by Gannett Company to bring paper to the printing presses for the Democrat and Chronicle in 1997. In the years since, the tunnel has become a hub for graffiti artists. Several proposals have been made to completely fill the remaining tunnel, redevelop the underground space, or convert the bridge to a pedestrian crossing. Portions have been filled in at the western end and the eastern end for new above-ground development. The Broad Street aqueduct, which contains part of the tunnel, was added to the National Register of Historic Places in 1976.

==== Major highways and roads ====
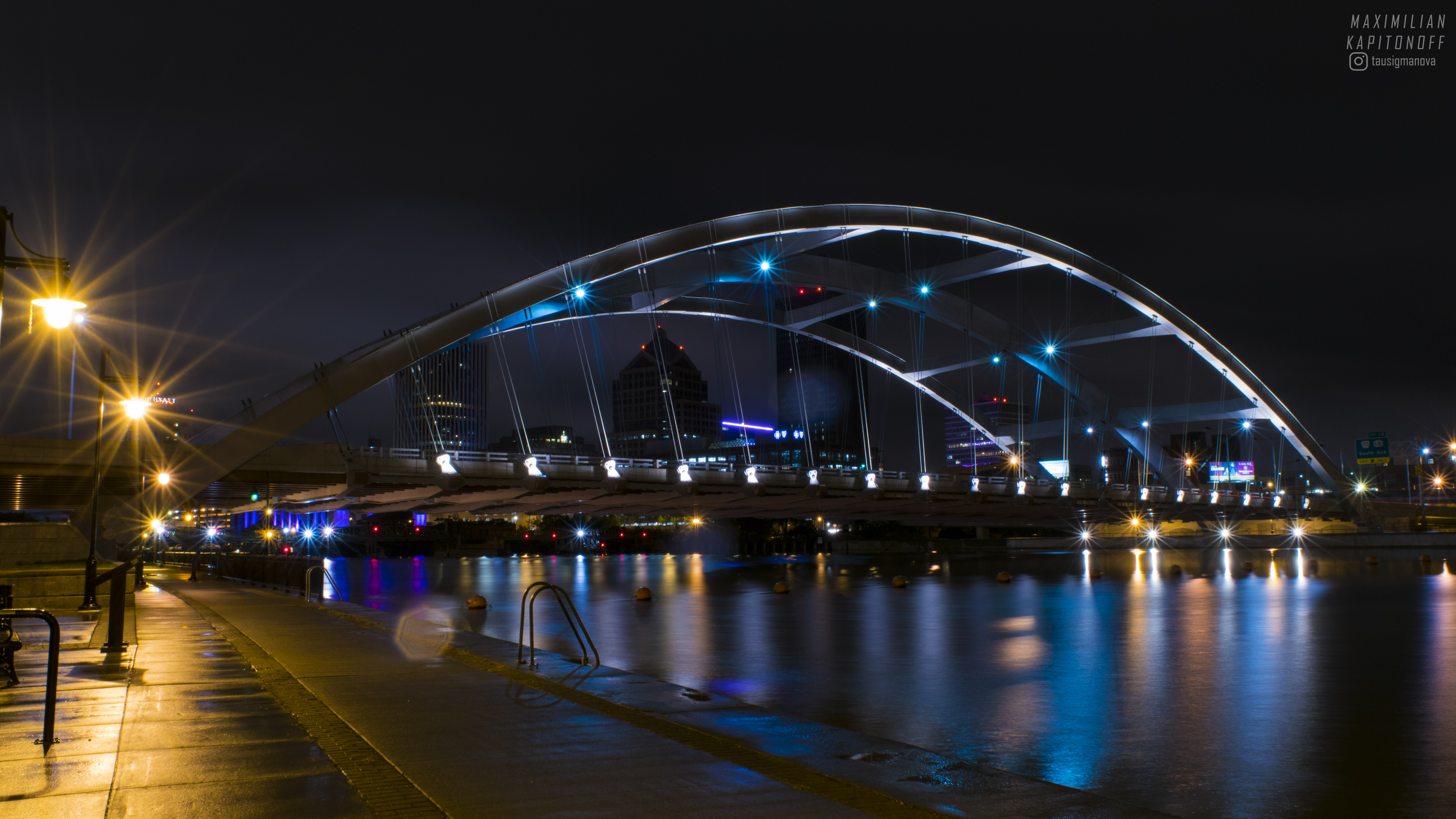
Frederick Douglass–Susan B. Anthony Memorial Bridge on Interstate 490

Three exits off the New York State Thruway (I-90) serve Rochester. Rochester's expressway system, conceived in the 1950s, was designed as two concentric circles with feeder expressways from the west, south and east. The system allows for quick travel within the metropolitan area and a lack of the traffic gridlock typically found in cities of comparable size; in part this is because the system was designed to accommodate rapid travel between the suburbs and downtown, and also because it was built when the city's population was over 330,000, whereas today it is a full third less.

The Outer Loop circles just outside the city limits while the former Inner Loop once circled around the immediate downtown area within the city (the easternmost sector was closed in 2015). From the west are Lake Ontario State Parkway, NY 531 and I-490; I-390 feeds from the south; and NY 104, NY 441, and I-490 approach from the east.

In the early 1970s, the Genesee Expressway Task Force, City leaders, and the New York State Department of Transportation studied the feasibility of connecting the outer and inner Loops with a new southern expressway. The proposed route extended north from the I-390 and I-590 interchange in Brighton, cutting through Rochester's Swillburg neighborhood. In 1972, consultants Berger Lehman Associates recommended a new 'Busway', an expressway with dedicated bus lanes, similar to Bus Rapid Transit. The expressway extension was never built. In 2016, the City of Rochester launched the Pace Car Program.

I-390 (Genesee Expressway)

- I-390 runs south–north, crossing I-90 (exit 46) and routing north through Rochester's western suburbs. Its northern end is at I-490, however, it continues north as NY 390 until it merges into the Lake Ontario State Parkway. South of I-90, I-390 runs to Avoca, where it meets with US 15 and the Southern Tier Expressway, I-86.

I-490 (Western/Eastern Expressway)

- I-490 runs west–east through Rochester, starting at Le Roy and ending in Victor. It interchanges with the two other Interstates in Rochester: I-390 at the western city limit and I-590 at the eastern limit, as well as connecting at both ends with the Thruway, I-90 (exits 47 and 45). In July 2007, a new bridge over the Genesee River was completed and named the Frederick Douglass–Susan B. Anthony Memorial Bridge.

I-590

- I-590 runs south–north through Rochester's eastern suburbs. Its southern end is at I-390, while the northern terminus is at I-490; the highway continues north to the shore of Lake Ontario as NY 590.
- In decreasing usage is the term "Can of Worms", referring to the previously dangerous at-grade intersection of I-490 and expressway NY 590 on the eastern edge of the Rochester city limits, bordering the suburb of Brighton. In the 1980s, a multimillion-dollar project created a system of overpasses and ramps that reduced the danger but resulted in the loss of certain exits.

NY 104 (Irondequoit-Wayne County Expressway, West Ridge Road)

- NY 104 – Just east of the NY 590 interchange, NY 104 becomes the Irondequoit-Wayne County Expressway and crosses the Irondequoit Bay Bridge. On the other side of the Bay Bridge, in the town of Webster, NY 104 has exits before returning to an at-grade highway at Basket Road.

NY 390

- NY 390 is an extension of Interstate 390 from the I-390/I-490 interchange in Gates. The northern terminus is at the Lake Ontario State Parkway in Greece, less than a mile from the Lake Ontario shoreline.

NY 590

- NY 590 is a limited-access extension of Interstate 590 that runs from an interchange between Interstate 490 and I-590 on the Brighton/Rochester border. The northern terminus is at Culver Road in Irondequoit, near Sea Breeze (the western shore of Irondequoit Bay at Lake Ontario).

Inner Loop

- The Inner Loop Runs from I-490 to Main Street on the north end and from 490 to Monroe Avenue at the south end. Formerly a loop, the eastern end was demolished and replaced with a surface road between 2014 and 2017. Unsigned reference NY 940T begins and ends at I-490, and the rest of the Loop is part of I-490 between exits 13 and 15, including the Frederick Douglass–Susan B. Anthony Memorial Bridge. This expressway is commonly used to define the borders of Downtown Rochester.

Lake Ontario State Parkway

- Lake Ontario State Parkway travels from Lakeside Beach State Park in Carlton, Orleans County. The eastern end is at Lake Avenue in the city of Rochester in Monroe County.

=== Public safety ===
Fire protection and BLS First Response services are provided by the Rochester Fire Department. The department employs 509 personnel and operates thirteen engines, six trucks, and heavy rescue from fifteen fire stations. In FY 2021–22, the department responded to 38,876 incidents. The current fire chief is Stefano Napolitano. Primary EMS coverage is contracted to American Medical Response of Rochester(AMR), previously Rural/Metro Medical Services.

Law enforcement services are provided by the Rochester Police Department. The current chief of police is David Smith. Independent oversight of the department is provided by the Police Accountability Board, established in 2019 to investigate and discipline officers for misconduct. In 2023, the New York Court of Appeals ruled that the board could not enforce disciplinary actions on any officers in the department, as it would violate the contract between the city and police union.

In 2019, Rochester had 1,540 reported violent crimes. That same year, Rochester had 7,142 property crime incidents. These included 33 murders, 429 robberies, 976 aggravated assaults, 1,269 burglaries, 5,222 larceny thefts, 102 forcible rapes, 651 auto thefts, and 83 acts of arson.

On November 12, 2021, Rochester Mayor Lovely Warren declared a state of emergency due to a rising violent crime rate in the city, which produced 81 homicides by December 31, the highest number of any year on record. Additional law enforcement assistance was requested from, and granted by, the state government. On July 21, 2022, Rochester Mayor Malik Evans declared another state of emergency due to ongoing gun violence.

Rochester experienced a decline in its violent crime rate in both 2023 and 2024. In 2024, there were 37 reported homicide incidents (there were 45 victims), a 26 percent drop compared with 2023. There was also a sharp decline in automotive vehicle thefts in 2024—2,068 reported incidents, down from the record 3,943 in 2023. Overall, property crime incidents were down 33 percent in 2024 compared to 2023.

=== Healthcare ===
Most healthcare services in the Rochester area are provided by University of Rochester Medical Center (URMC) and Rochester Regional Health (RRH). Major hospitals in the Rochester area include:

- Highland Hospital, a URMC facility with 261 beds. Highland is a level 1 perinatal center and a primary stroke center.
- Rochester General Hospital, a RRH facility with 528 beds. Rochester General is a comprehensive stroke center and level 2 perinatal center.
- Rochester Psychiatric Center, a psychiatric hospital operated by the New York State Department of Mental Hygiene. The hospital's campus contains the abandoned Terrence Building.
- Strong Memorial Hospital, a URMC facility with 886 beds. Strong is home to the Golisano Children's Hospital for pediatric care, and is an AIDS center, burn center, comprehensive stroke center, level I trauma center for both pediatric and adult care, and regional perinatal center.
- Unity Hospital, a RRH facility with 311 beds. Unity is a regional perinatal center and primary stroke center.

In 2023, The Guardian reported that Rochester was becoming a desirable community for transgender individuals due to its network of gender-affirming care providers, such as Trillium Health.

== Notable people ==
Notable individuals who were born in or lived in Rochester include American social reformer and women's rights activist Susan B. Anthony, African-American social reformer and abolitionist Frederick Douglass, and Kodak founder George Eastman.

== Sister cities ==
Rochester has twelve sister cities, as designated by Sister Cities International. They are all dedicated by a branched concrete walkway over the Genesee River, dubbed the Sister Cities Bridge (known as the Frank and Janet Lamb Bridge since October 2006):

Rochester's sister cities are:

- Rennes, France (1958); the Pont de Rennes Bridge, a pedestrian bridge over the Genesee River, was renamed in honor of this relationship
- Würzburg, Germany (1964)
- Caltanissetta, Italy (1965)
- Rehovot, Israel (1972)
- Kraków, Poland (1973)
- Bamako, Mali (1975)
- (Republic of Ireland) Waterford, Ireland (1983)
- Veliky Novgorod, Russia (1990)
- Hamamatsu, Japan (1996)
- Puerto Plata, Dominican Republic (1997)
- Xianyang, China (2007)
- Alytus, Lithuania (2009)

== See also ==
- USS Rochester, 3 ships
- Rochester, Kent
