= Downtown Rochester =

- Neighborhood
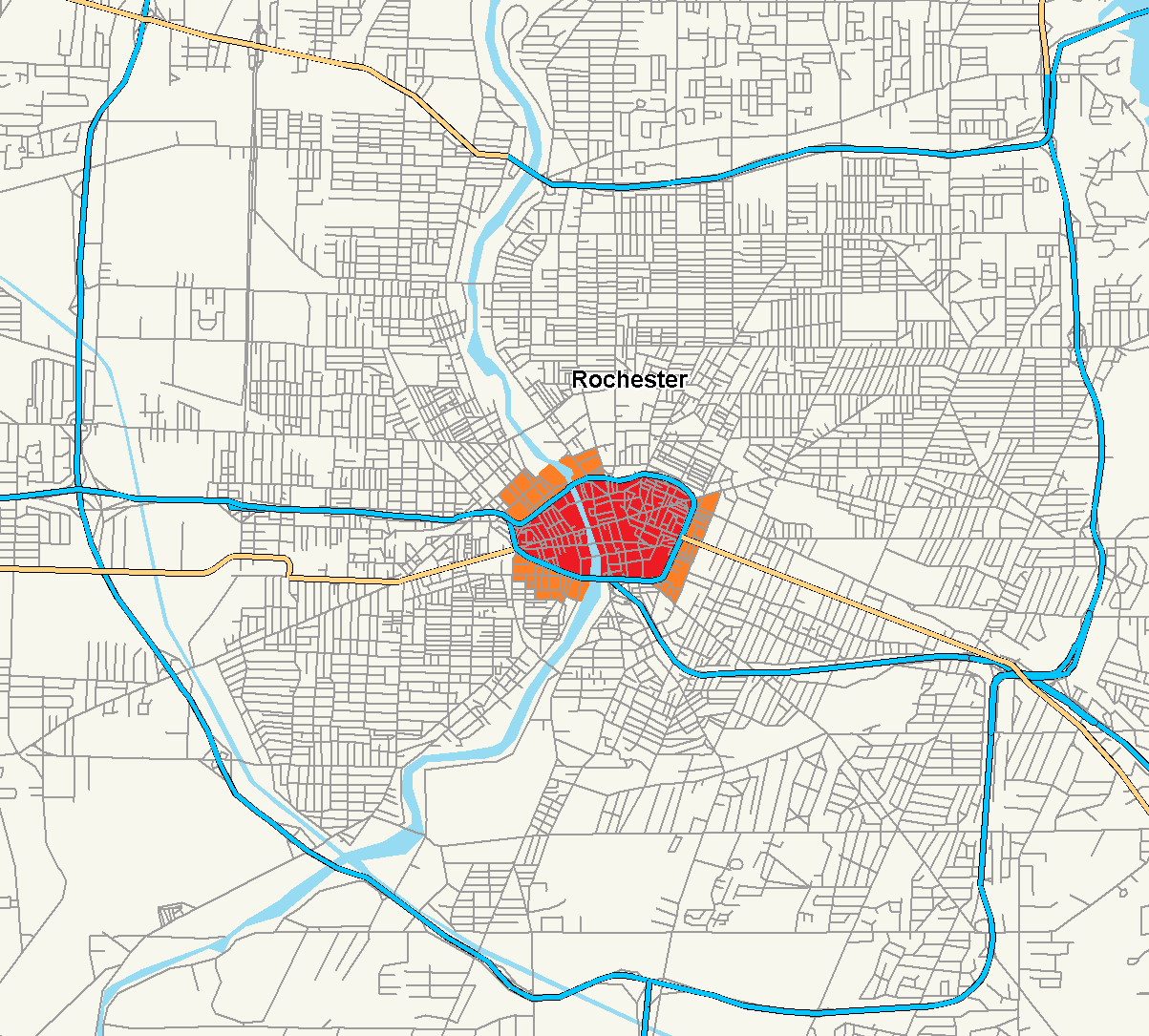
- Location of downtown Rochester. Red areas are always defined as downtown; orange areas are sometimes defined as downtown.
- Interactive map of Downtown Rochester
- Coordinates: 43°9′25″N 77°36′27″W
- Country: United States
- State: New York
- City: Rochester

Population (2014)
  - Total: 6,138
- ZIP Codes: 14603, 14604, 14608, 14614
- Area code: 585
- Website: www.rochesterdowntown.com

Downtown Rochester is the economic center of Rochester, New York, and the 2nd largest in Upstate New York, employing more than 50,000 people, and housing more than 10,800.

== History ==
Rochesterville, as it was once called, was founded in present day downtown Rochester by Col. Nathaniel Rochester, Maj. Charles Carroll, and Col. William Fitzhugh, all of Hagerstown, Maryland. After the opening of the Erie Canal, which flowed through downtown Rochester until the early 20th century, the area boomed as a result of the city's flour industry. By 1834, some 20 flour mills were producing 500,000 barrels annually, the population reached 13,500 and the city area expanded to 4,000 acres (16 km^{2}). Rochester was then re-chartered as a city, and Jonathan Child, son-in-law of Col. Rochester, was elected its first mayor.

Following the Civil War, many post-war industrial companies were founded in Rochester, including Kodak, Bausch & Lomb, Western Union, and Gleason Works. The City Hall opened downtown in 1875.

At the turn of the century, Rochester was a thriving city. Street cars operated throughout the area and a subway was opened in 1927 on the old Erie Canal bed that ran through downtown. The subway operated for 29 years until it closed in 1956. After the subway was shut down, a series of bus routes were opened and a new auxiliary Interstate Highway was opened that would become I-490.

In 1962, Midtown Plaza was constructed in downtown Rochester. Midtown was a major urban shopping mall and the first urban indoor shopping mall in the United States. Midtown Plaza brought many people downtown, but it would soon become a victim of suburbanization. From the 1960s into the 1980s, suburban shopping malls such as Eastview Mall in Victor and The Marketplace Mall in Henrietta opened up. McCurdy's and Forman's closed in 1994. Their closing was quickly followed by the closing of the Midtown branch of Wegmans Food Markets. Before long the mall's only tenants were Peebles department store, Radio Shack, Payless Shoes, some downscale clothing stores, a dollar store, two jewelry stores, a gift shop and a US post office. The mall finally closed in 2007 and the land was redeveloped into a mix of residential and office space. Midtown Tower was renovated and reopened as a mixed use tower of apartments, condos, restaurants and stores called Tower 280 in 2015. Windstream opened a regional headquarters in the former Seneca building part of the mall and Gannett constructed an adjacent office building at the corner of Main and Clinton for the Democrat and Chronicle that opened in May 2016. In 2017, a portion of the I-490 Inner Loop was removed and converted to a surface street lined with new housing developments.

== Community profile ==
A map of certain attractions within the Inner Loop

Downtown Rochester is showcased by several skyscrapers including the 450 ft (140 m) Xerox Tower, creating an urban setting. In the early 2000s, the City of Rochester built new condos and other residential buildings in Downtown with huge success. Older buildings are being converted into lofts. The current vacancy rate downtown is less than the 5% average in most downtowns. A $200 million renovation of the massive Sibley Building is ongoing, turning what has recently served mainly as office space into a mixed-use (stores and apartments) development.

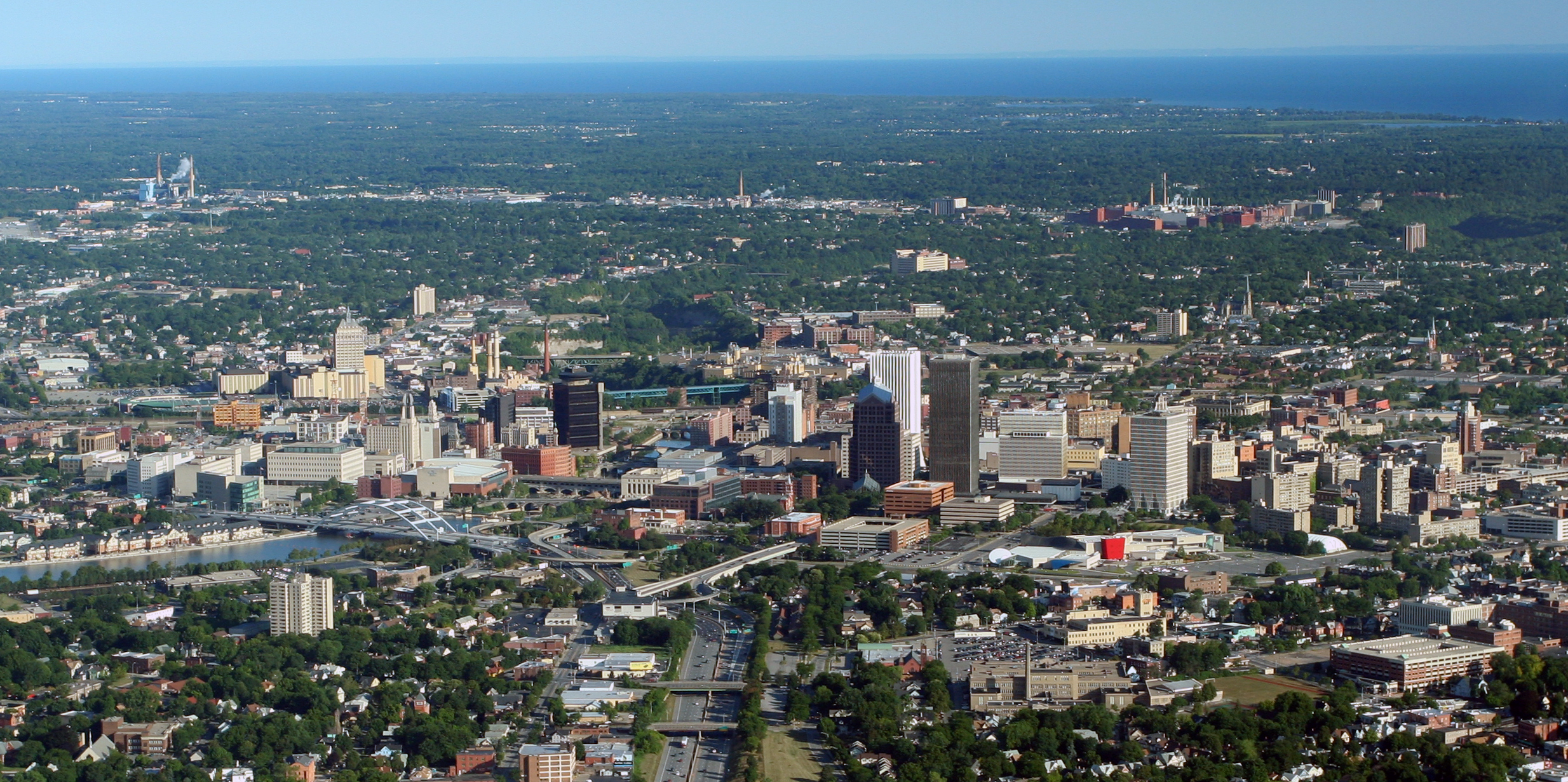
Downtown Rochester as seen from the air (2007)

The downtown area is also home to many shops, bars, restaurants and parks, the heaviest concentration being in the East End near the Eastman School of Music. Recent years have also seen a growing concentration of nightclubs in the Saint Paul Quarter near the new RTS Transit Hub in between St. Paul Street and Clinton Avenue. Manhattan Square Park, located downtown, changes seasonally. During the winter months, the park attracts ice skaters to its kidney-shaped rink while in the summer the rink becomes a pool equipped with three fountains. Every Thursday in the summer the park hosts large outdoor concerts, a series known as Party in the Park. The shows used to be free, but the venue now has a $5 cover charge. There is also a boat tour on the Genesee River. The Mary Jemison Boat Tour provides a boat tour of the Genesee River overlooking the Rochester skyline.

Washington Square Park is located in the heart of the business district, centered around a large civil war-era monument to Abraham Lincoln. For much of the city's history it has served as a backdrop for protests, rallies and occasional celebrations. Thousands have managed to fit in the park for demonstrations concerning police shootings and women's rights despite its relatively small size. The square was also the site of a months-long encampment by Occupy Rochester; thousands of locals protesting income inequality essentially lived in the park until they were removed by police in January 2012.

== Economy ==
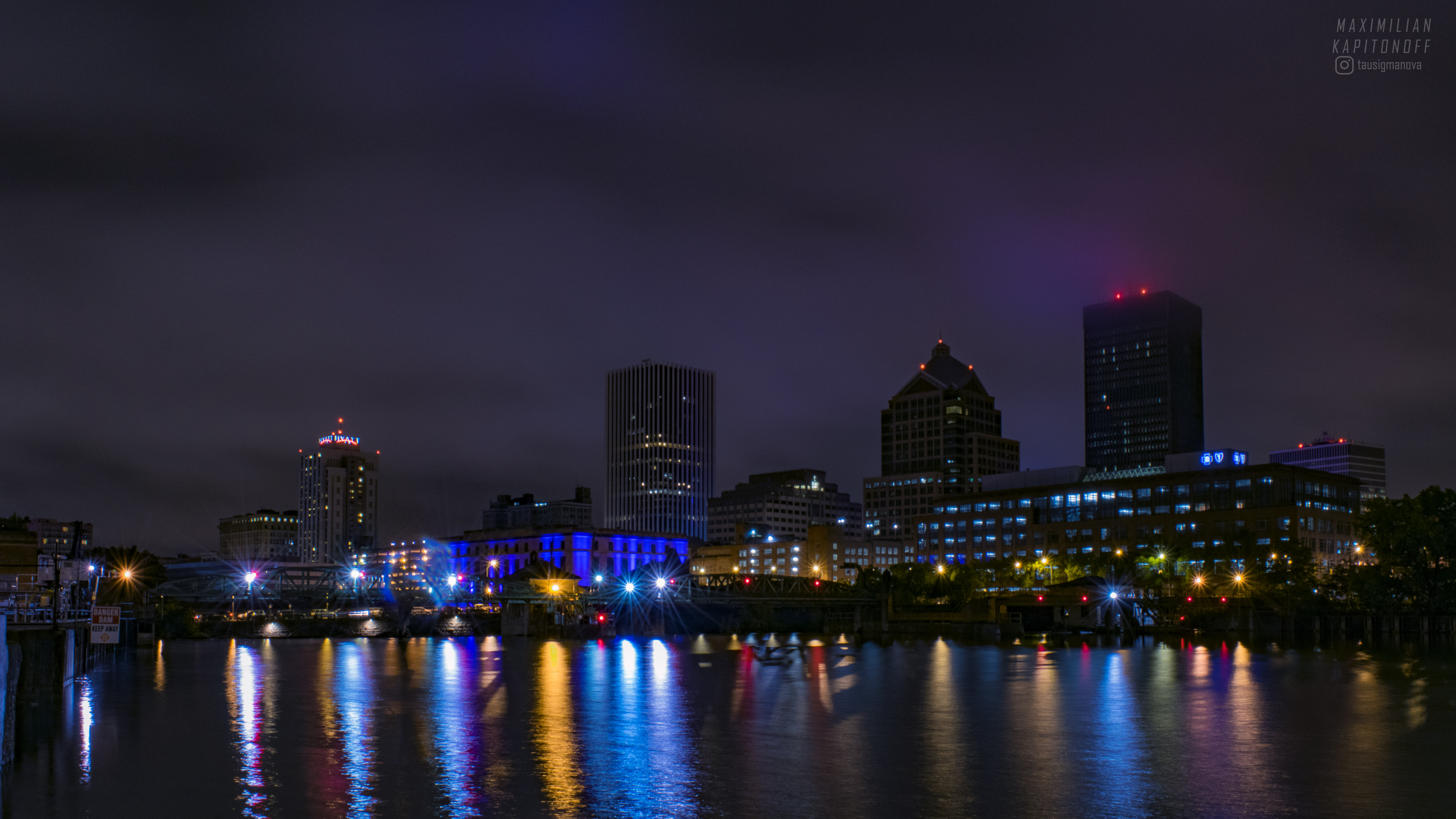
The eastern half of Downtown Rochester, seen from across the Genesee

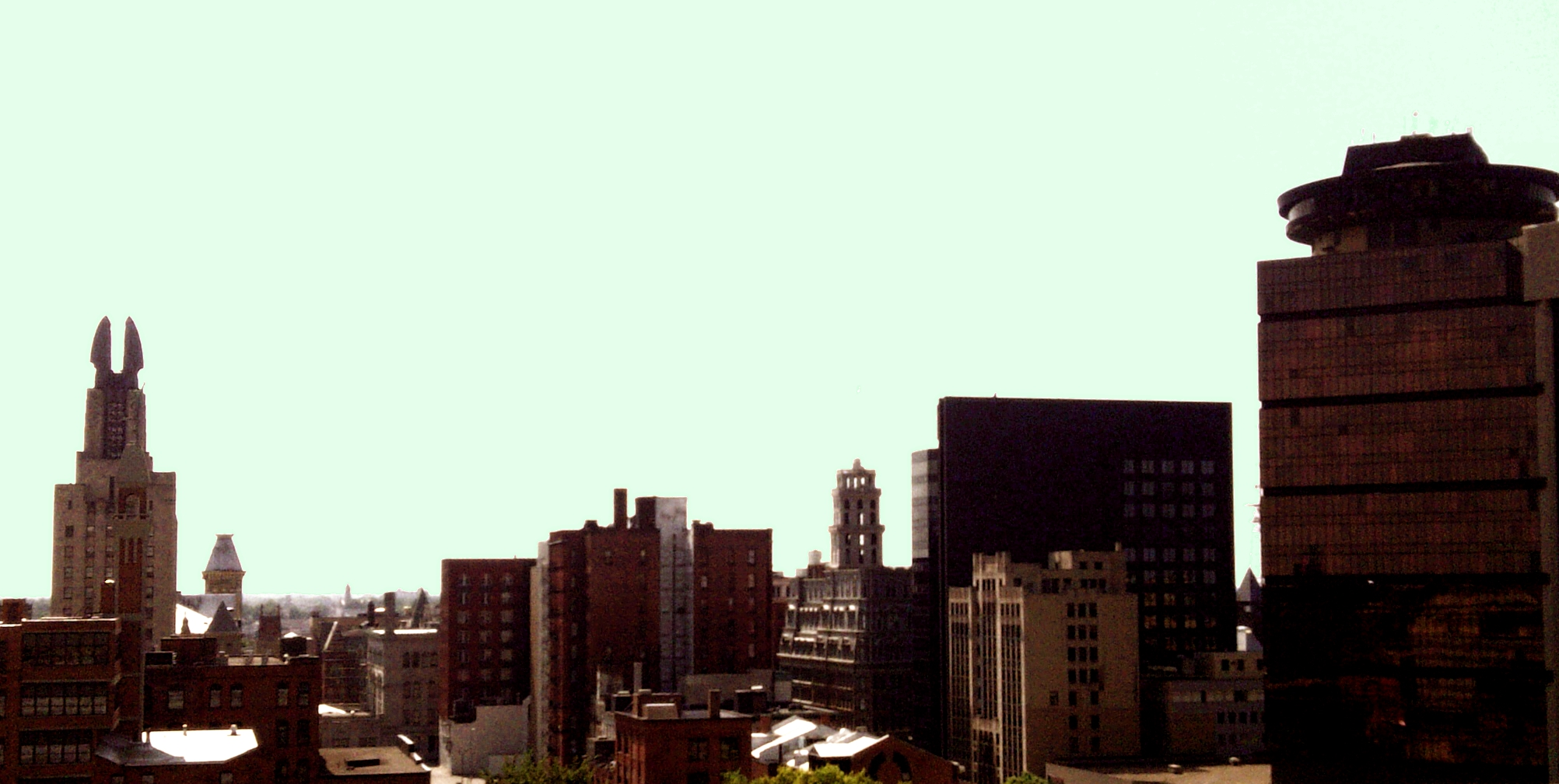
The western half of Downtown Rochester, seen from Washington Square

As the hub of the metropolitan economy, Downtown Rochester is home to many of the region's largest employers. The corporate headquarters of ESL Federal Credit Union, Eastman Kodak, Frontier Communications, and several other companies are located in or around downtown. In addition, Chase Bank, Bank of America, Carestream, and Charter Spectrum have large branch offices located downtown.

Downtown is also home to the Rochester City Government, the Rochester City School District, and the offices for Monroe County, as well as the city, county and federal courts for the region.

In 2014, Hart's Local Grocers opened in Downtown Rochester, next to the Little Theatre. Harts was the first full-service grocery store to open in over 20 years.

== Transportation ==
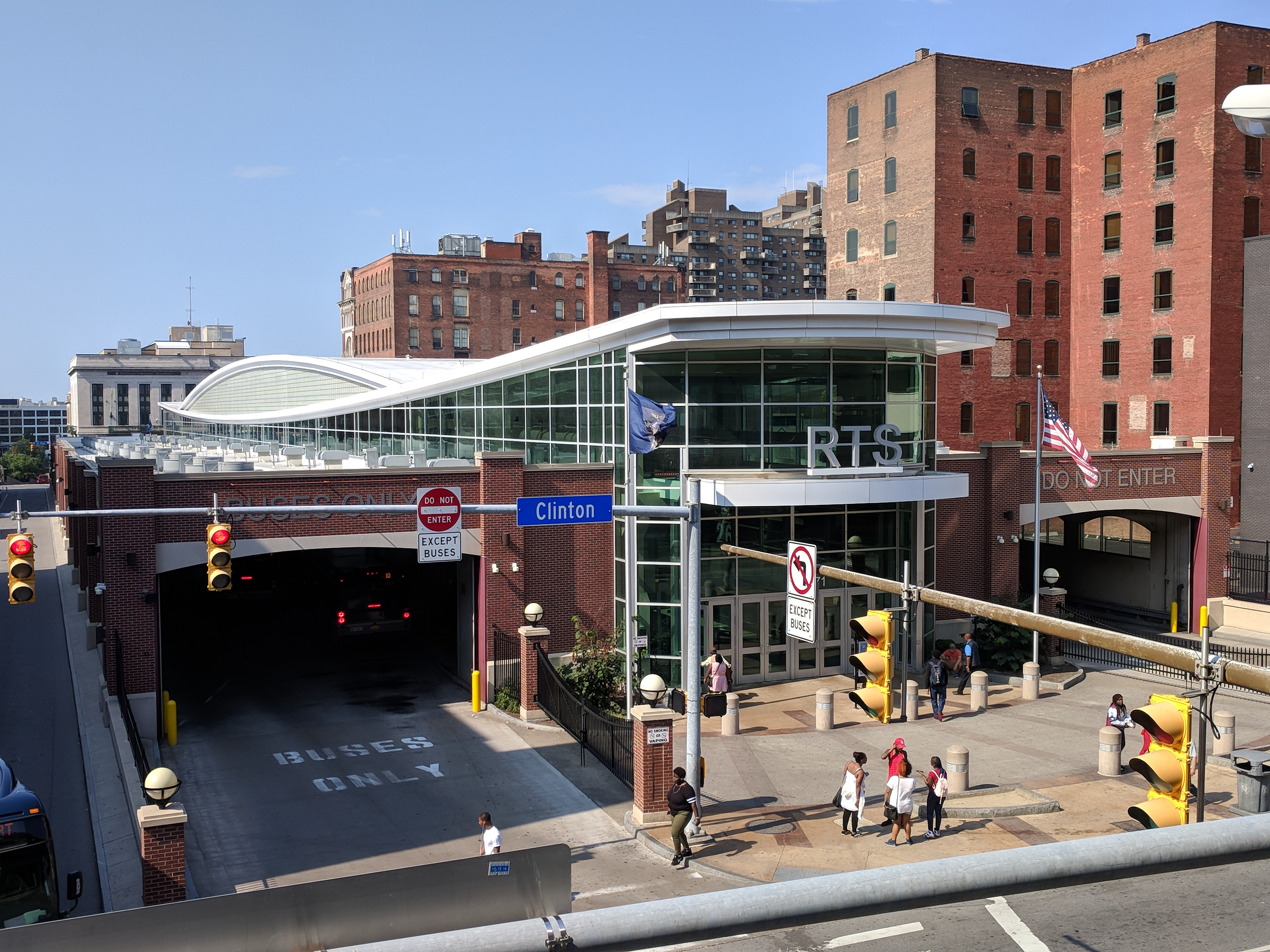
RTS Transit Center on Clinton Ave. and Saint Paul St.

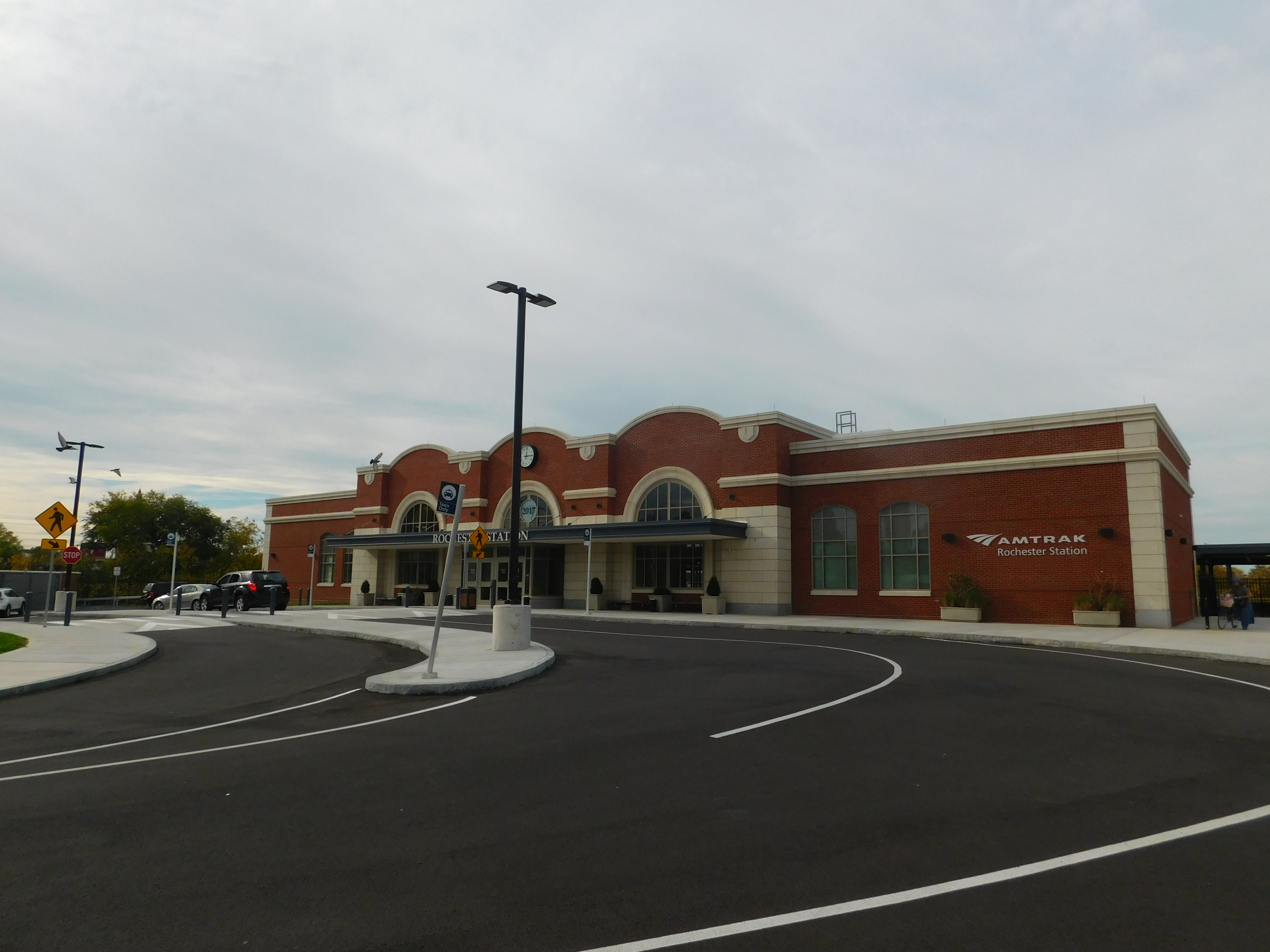
Louise M. Slaughter Rochester Station on Central Ave.

Downtown Rochester acts as the hub for the Rochester-Genesee Regional Transit Service. Almost all public transportation in the metropolitan area passes through the RTS transit center. Opened in 2014, the transit center is a 40-gate climate controlled hub for nearly every RGRTA/RTS line in existence.

Intercity passenger rail service (Amtrak) is accessible via Louise M. Slaughter Rochester Station on central avenue several blocks north of the inner loop; Rochester is currently served by the Empire Service, Maple Leaf and Lake Shore Limited routes. Greyhound, Trailways, Peter Pan and Megabus lines run from the same location to other large metros throughout the northeast. A new, multilevel intermodal transportation center (for both intercity bus and train travel) was constructed and opened in 2017. The station is nearly 8 times larger than the former station built in 1978, with concessions, a large, airy main concourse and elevated platforms intended to one day handle higher-speed rail. Currently the station is serviced by Amtrak, taxi and two RTS routes. Phase 2 plans call for both intercity bus (which currently stop across the street) and train traffic to be routed through this same terminal, which is closely modeled after the original 1914 New York Central Railroad Station (also known as Bragdon Station) that was torn down mid-20th century and is named in honor of former longtime Congresswomen Louise Slaughter.

== Landmarks ==
The following buildings, museums and cultural institutions of note are located in Downtown Rochester.

- Blue Cross Arena
- Innovation Square
- Bausch & Lomb Place
- The Metropolitan
- One HSBC Plaza
- First Federal Plaza
- Times Square Building
- Tower 280
- Rundel Memorial Library
- Hyatt Regency Rochester
- Strong National Museum of Play
- Kodak Tower
- The Eastman Theater and the Eastman School of Music
- Geva Theatre Center
- Rochester Contemporary Art Center
- High Falls
- Frontier Field
- Monroe Community College

== Districts/neighborhoods ==
Downtown Rochester comprises seven primary districts.

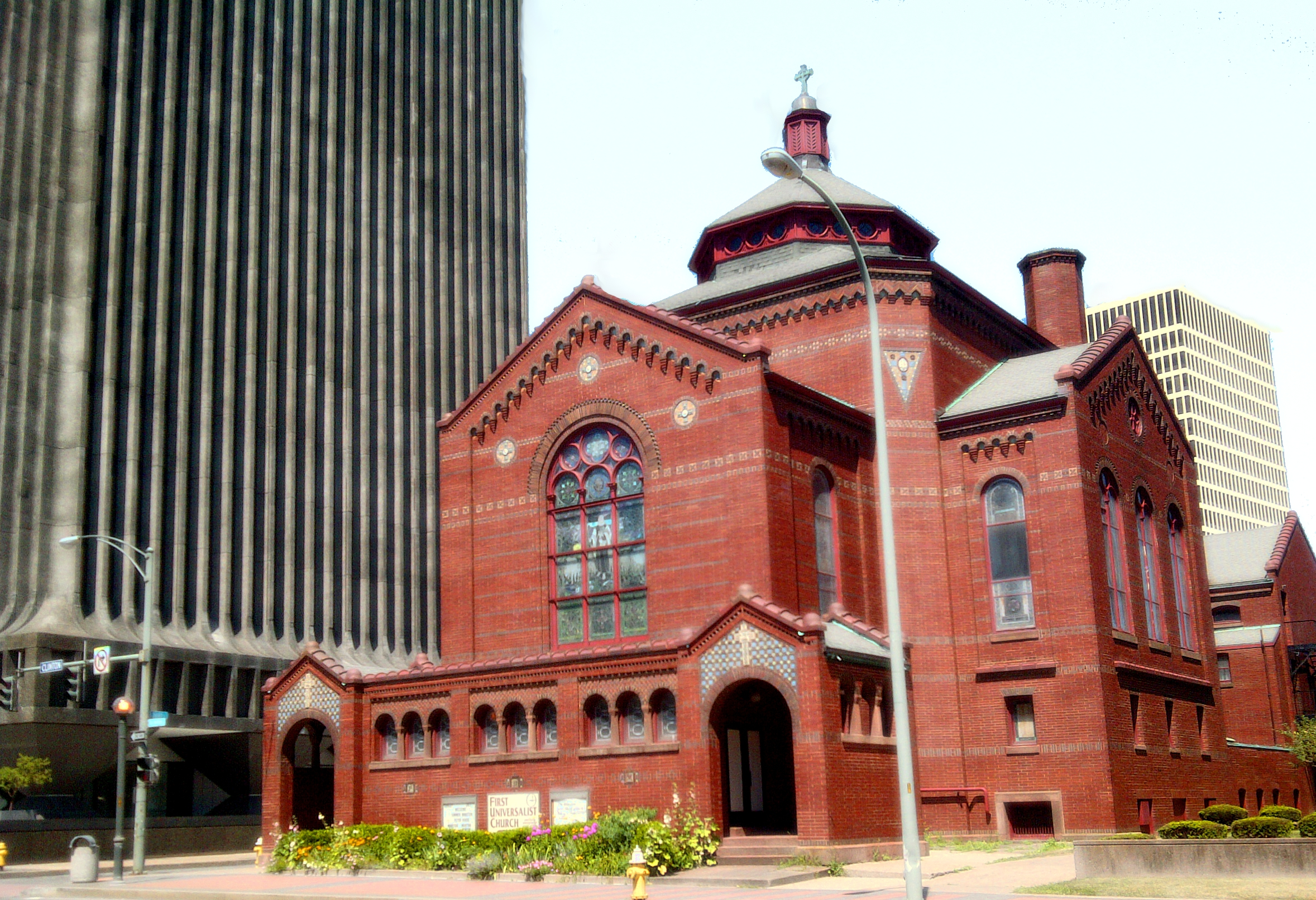
First Unitarian Church

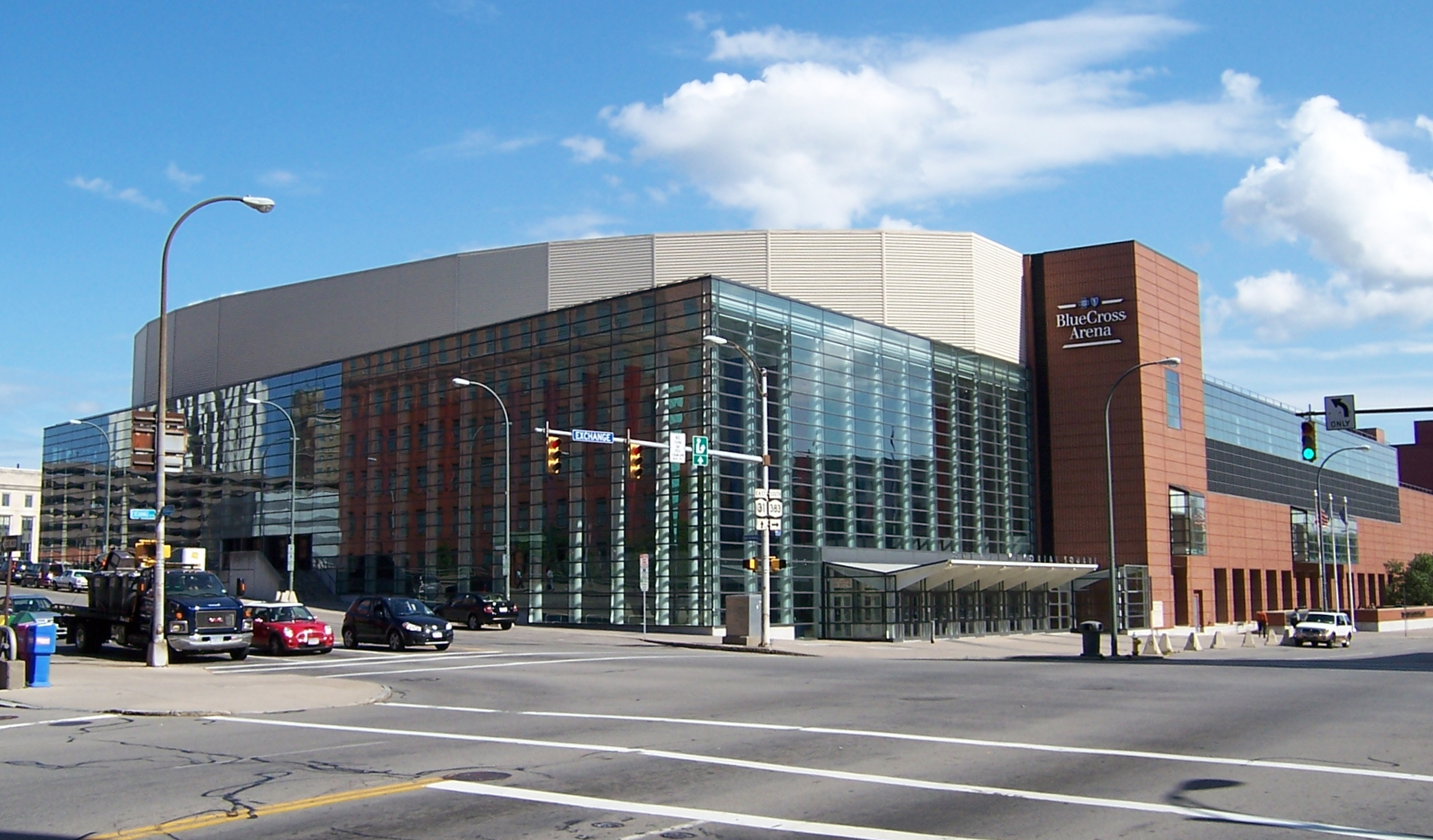
Blue Cross Arena

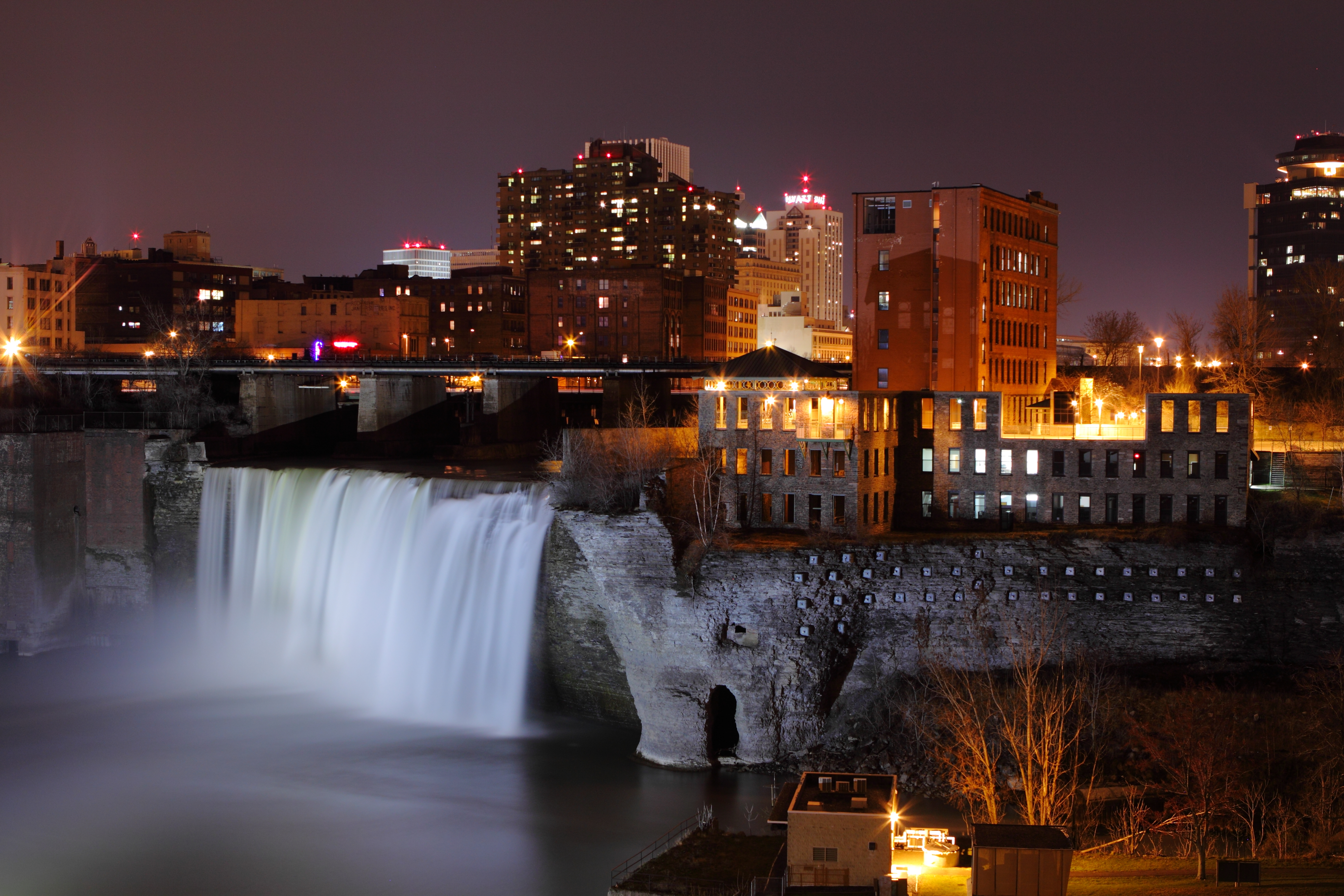
High Falls

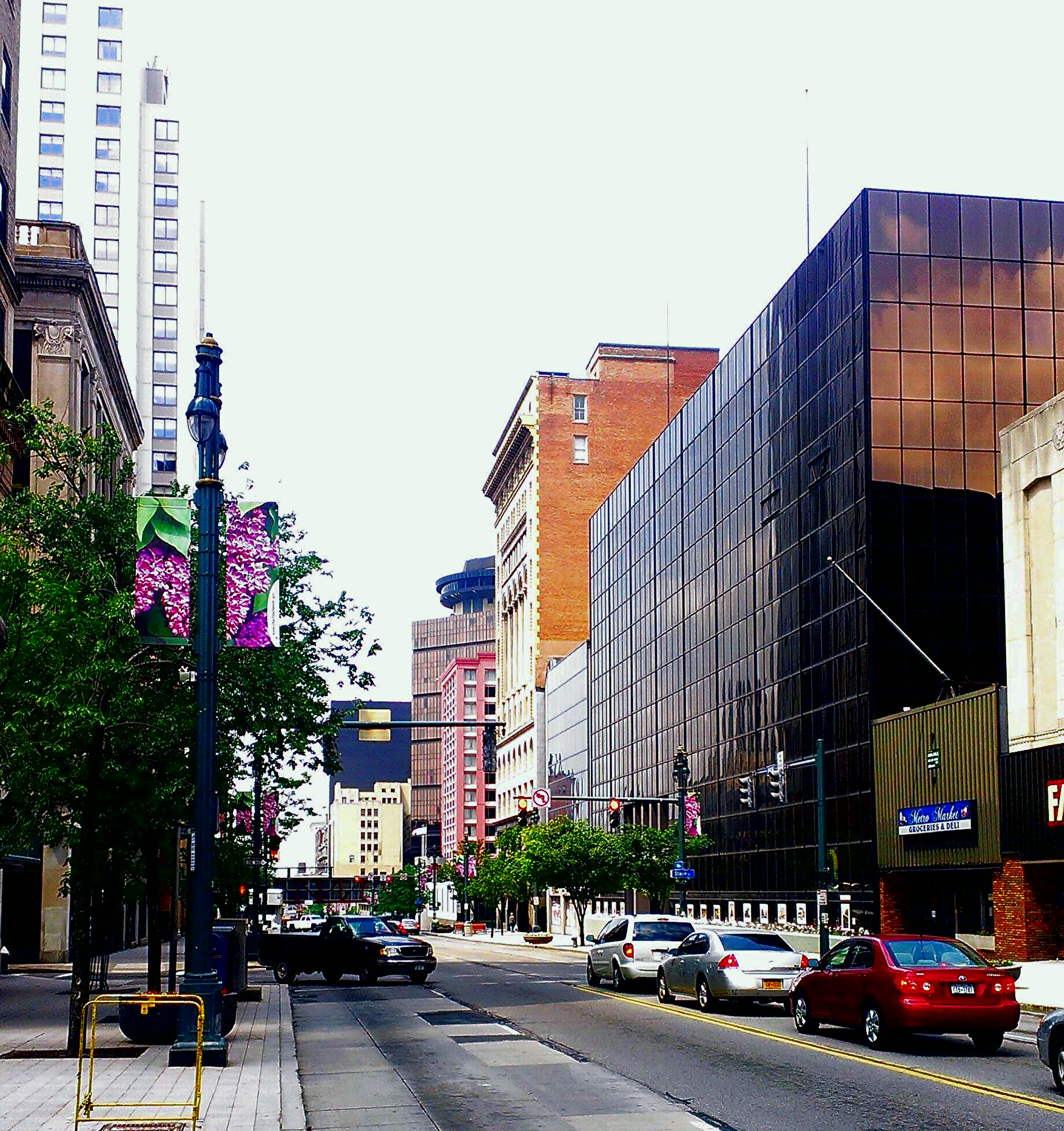
East Main Street

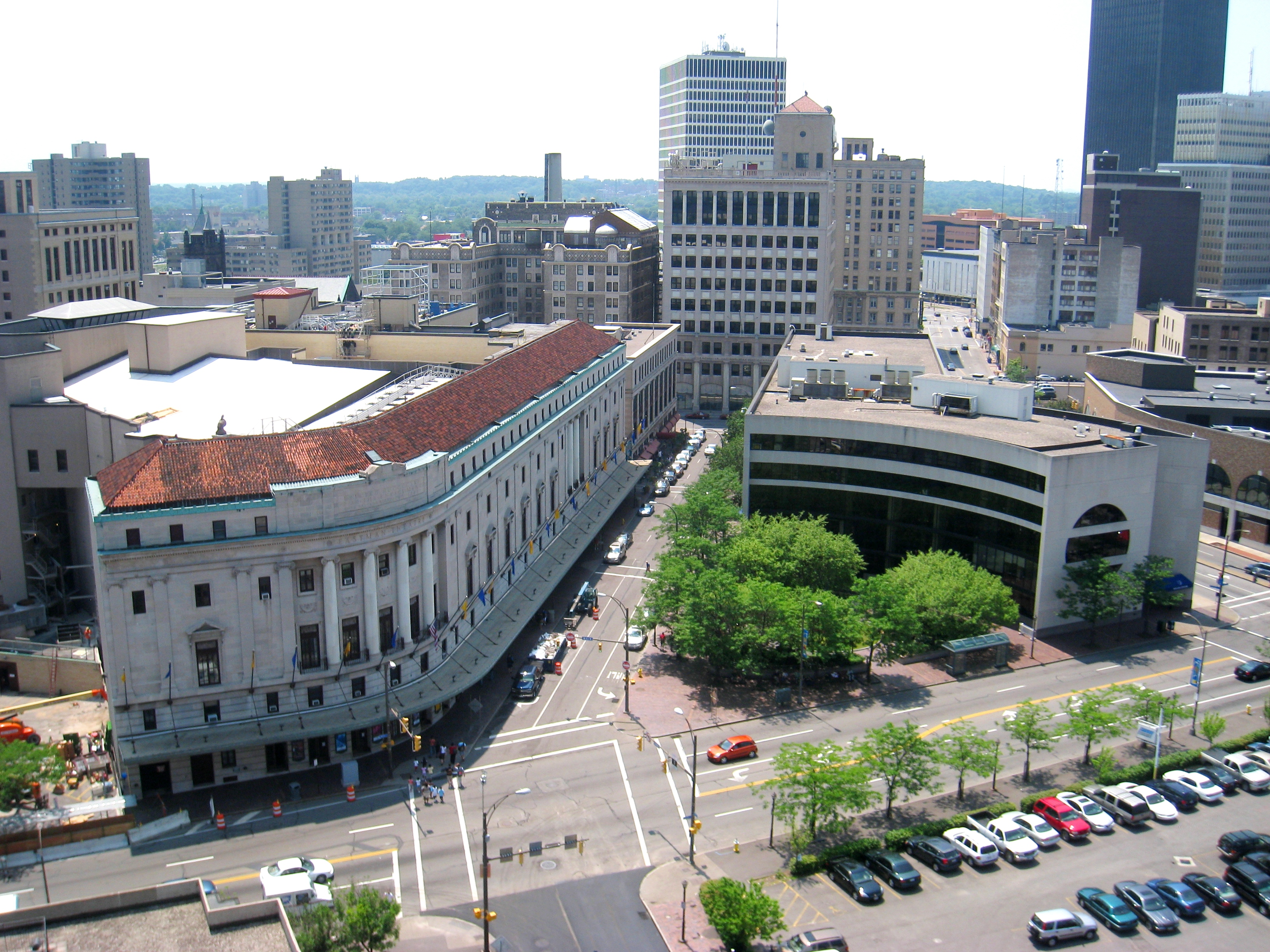
Eastman School of Music and Eastman Theater

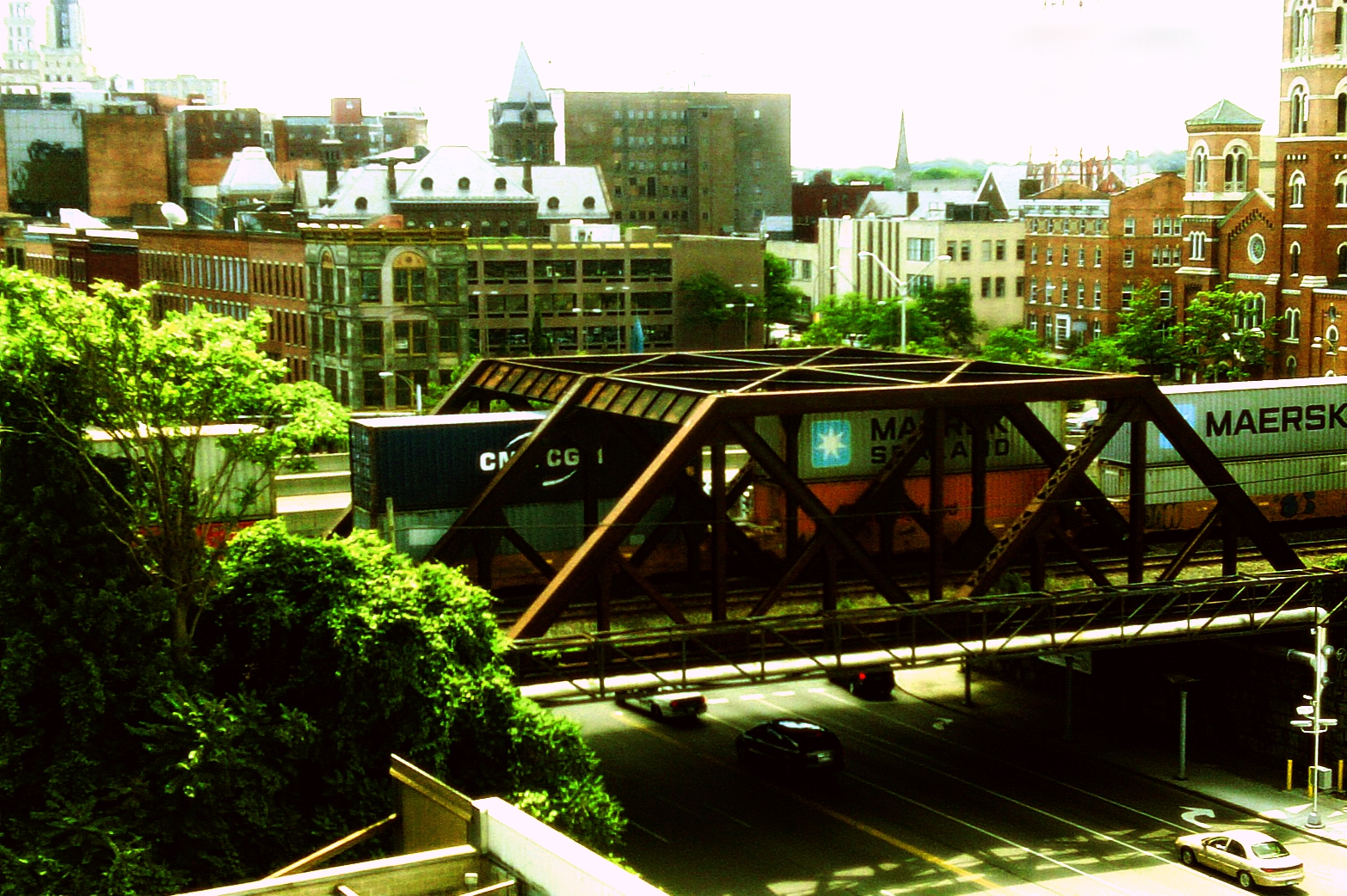
Rail Bridge running along the northern edge of the Inner Loop

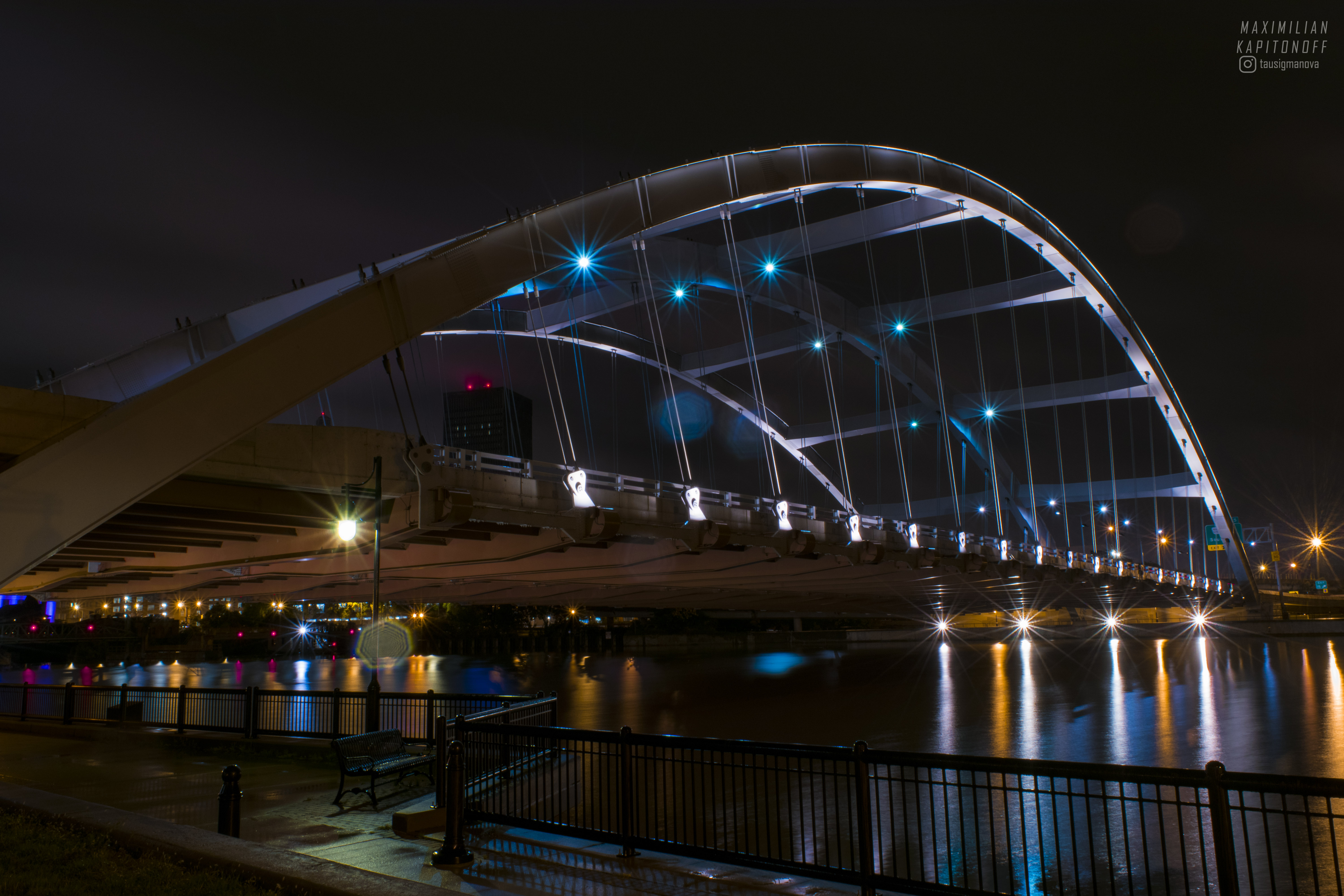
Susan B. Anthony/Frederick Douglass Bridge

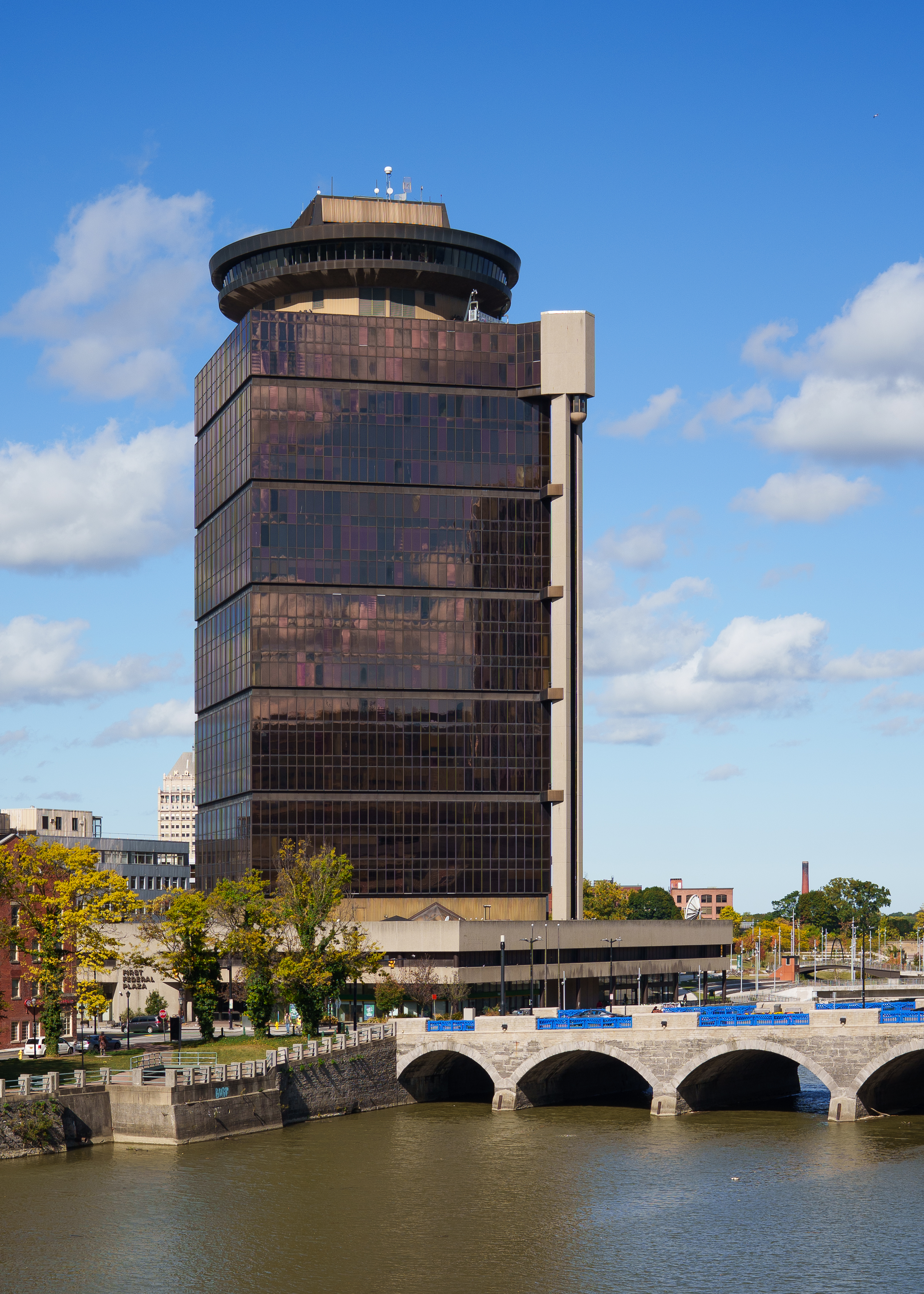
First Federal Plaza

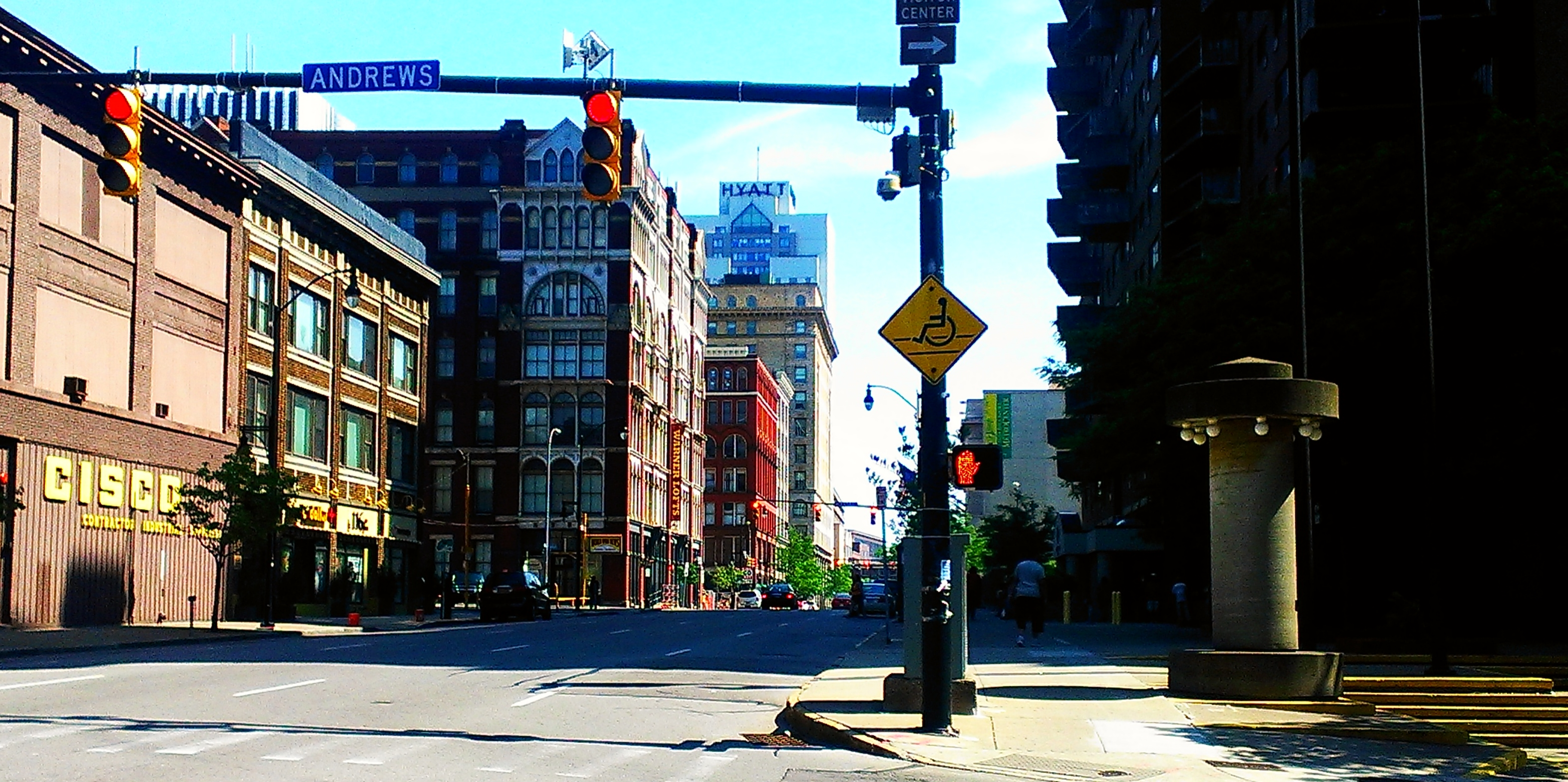
Saint Paul Quarter

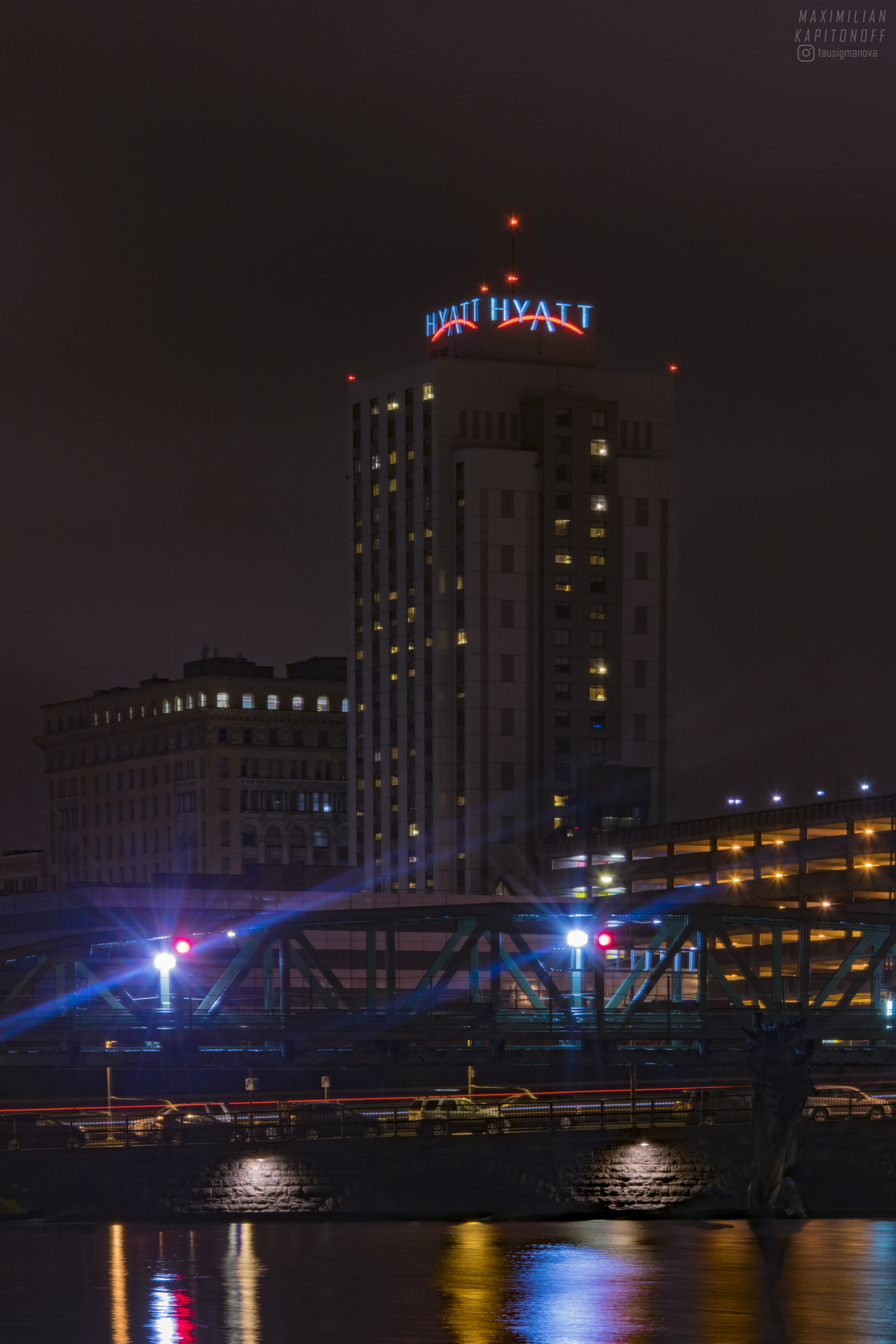
Hyatt Regency Hotel in Downtown Rochester

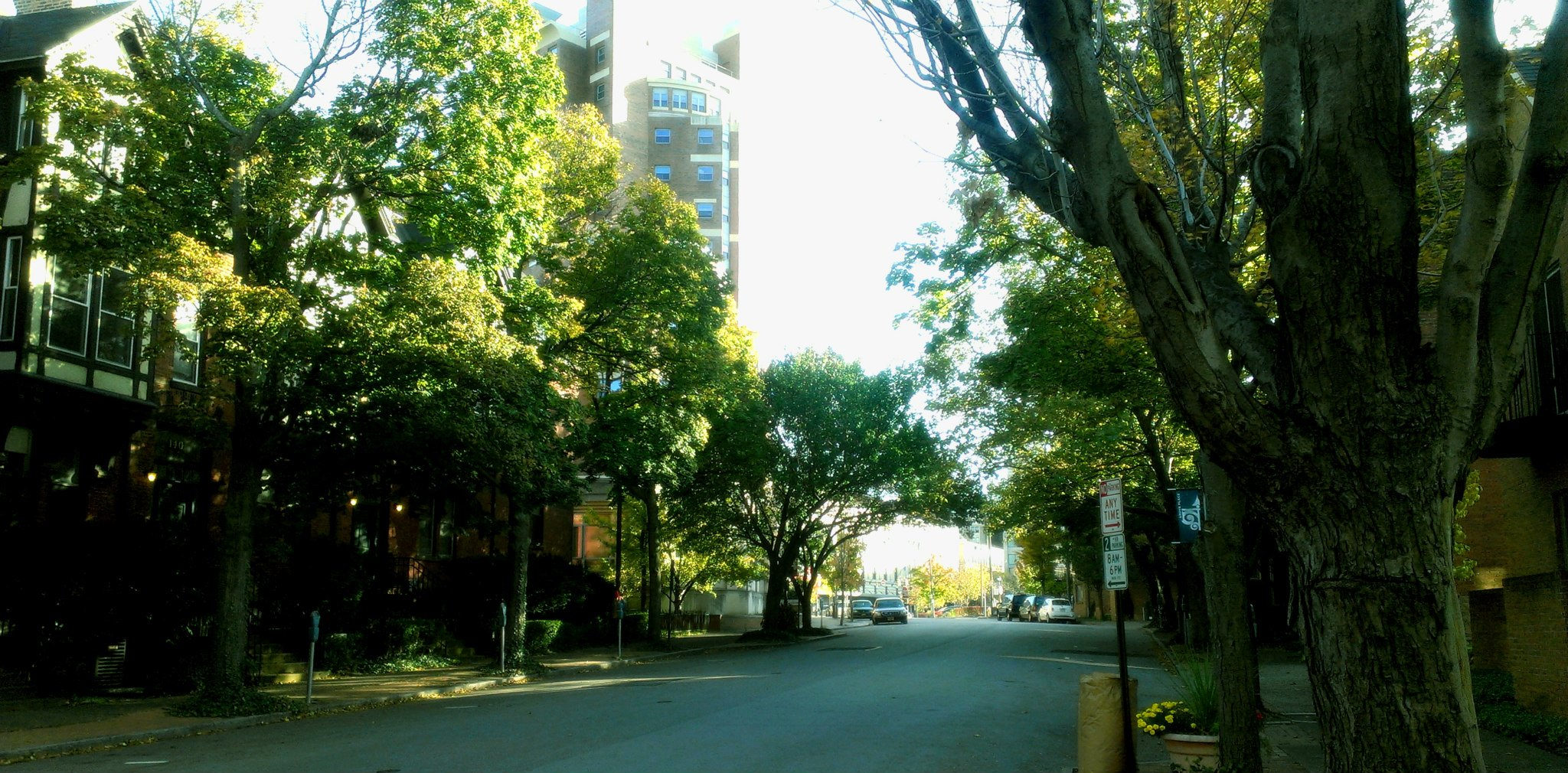
Grove Place neighborhood near the Eastman School of Music

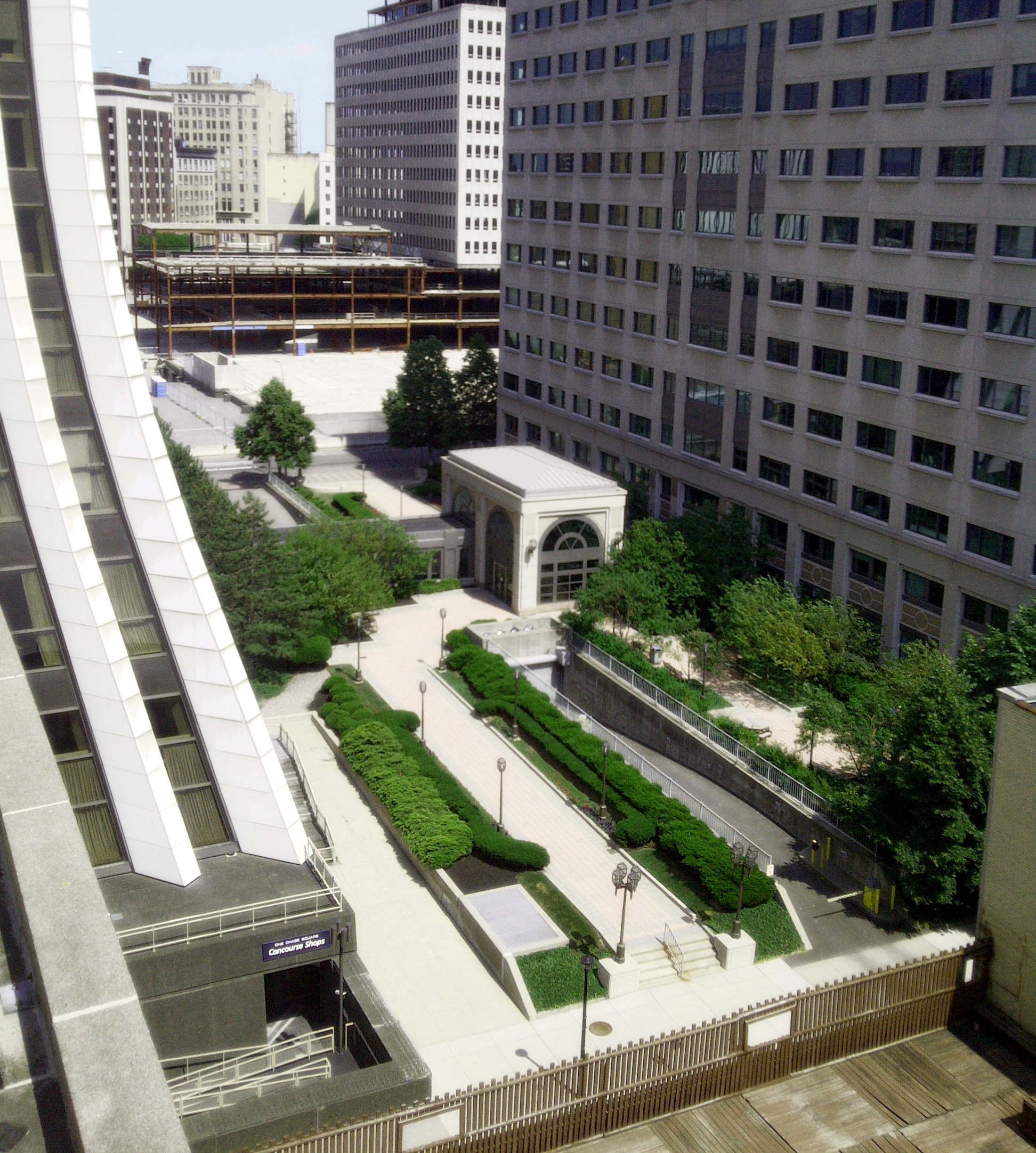
Square and concourse shops at the Metropolitan

The Central Business District, also called Washington Square or Main, is the location of several major businesses including Xerox, Chase Bank, Bausch and Lomb, Washington Square Park, the Riverside Convention Center, and the Rundel Memorial Library. The three tallest buildings in Rochester are found here.

The High Falls District is centered around High Falls, the site of many of the old Rochester factories and warehouses. The area was the site of a largely unsuccessful city-sponsored project to create an entertainment district in the northern part of Downtown, though several bars and restaurants are still in place. During the summer and on major holidays, the falls themselves are lit up in a high-tech lights show. Many of the old industrial buildings in the neighborhood have been renovated extensively and converted into condominiums and loft apartments. Frontier Field, corporate headquarters of Eastman Kodak and the downtown campus of Monroe Community College are located in the High Falls District. The 360/365 Film Festival is the successor to the High Falls Film Festival.

Grove Place is a small residential neighborhood in north-east downtown. Most of the structures are historical apartment buildings, row houses and Victorian townhomes. Most of the residents in Grove place are students and professional musicians associated with the nearby Eastman School of Music

St. Paul Quarter is another residential district also in north-east downtown, located next to Grove Place. Initially, St. Paul was composed mainly of sweatshops, factories and warehouses built in the 19th century that were later renovated and converted into apartments. Recent history saw the area become a home for many young professionals and students at the Eastman School, then one of the city's premier nightlife districts. Clubs, Bars, Restaurants and Cafes can be found throughout the St. Paul Quarter, and the neighborhood is one of several premier locations for the Rochester International Jazz Festival (one of the largest festivals of its kind in North America).

The East End is the hub of the metropolitan area's dining, nightlife and music culture, named for being the terminal point of East Avenue. As the city's primary nightlife district the East End is packed with clubs, bars and high-end restaurants mainly concentrated along East Avenue and Alexander Street. The Eastman School of Music, which consistently ranks among the top three musical conservatories in the nation alongside the Juilliard School and the Bloomington School at Indiana University, is found on East Avenue alongside the school's Eastman Theater, one of the premier performing arts centers in Rochester. The other major point of interest in the district is the Strong National Museum of Play, the largest museum of its kind in the United States. Festivals include the Rochester International Jazz Festival (conducted mostly in the East End) and the East End Festival. Art and Film activity is concentrated at the Rochester Contemporary Art Center and the Little Theater, one of the oldest art-house movie theaters in the country.

The Four Corners area is located on the Western shore of the Genesee River and is primarily a commercial district. The Four Corners is home to some of Rochester's finest examples of art-deco architecture, including the Powers Building and the Times Square Building. Also found in the Four Corners are the primary offices for the City of Rochester and Monroe County, Blue Cross Arena, the Monroe County Court (the Civic and Justice Center), and the iconic First Federal Plaza building.

The Cascade District is found to the west of Four Corners. Previously occupied by factories and storage houses, the Cascade District is now another mixed residential/commercial area characterized by high-end apartments and condos found in renovated industrial spaces.

== See also ==
- List of tallest buildings in Rochester, New York
