= Corn Hill, Rochester, New York =

Corn Hill
- Neighborhood
- Location in New York
- Coordinates: 43.1445°N 77.6228°W
- Country: United States
- State: New York
- City: Rochester
- Website: cornhill.org

- Third Ward Historic District
- U.S. National Register of Historic Places
- U.S. Historic district
- NRHP reference No.: 74001262
- Added to NRHP: 1974

Corn Hill is a historic neighborhood in southwest Rochester, New York, United States, situated on the west bank of the Genesee River immediately south of downtown. Originally known as the Third Ward, it was Rochester's most prestigious residential neighborhood throughout much of the 19th century. The Third Ward Historic District was listed on the National Register of Historic Places in 1974, and the City of Rochester designated the Corn Hill Historic Preservation District in 1977. The neighborhood is bounded by the Genesee River to the east, Interstate 490 to the north, and Ford Street to the west and south.

== History ==
=== Early settlement ===
The origins of the neighborhood's name are debated. It may derive from the cultivation of corn by the Seneca people who inhabited the area before European settlement, from pioneer farming of the crop, or as a reference to the Cornhill district in London. Colonel Nathaniel Rochester, the city's founder, was among the earliest prominent residents of the Third Ward.

=== 19th-century prominence ===
From approximately 1830 to 1880, the Third Ward served as Rochester's premier residential address. Wealthy merchants, industrialists, and civic leaders built elaborate homes in the prevailing architectural styles of the era, creating a dense streetscape of Greek Revival, Italianate, Gothic Revival, and Victorian residences. The historic district encompasses approximately 126 contributing structures from this period of significance.

Notable residents included Leonard Jerome, a financier and the maternal grandfather of British Prime Minister Winston Churchill, who lived in the Third Ward during the 1840s and 1850s. Frederick Douglass published his abolitionist newspaper The North Star from the basement of the African Methodist Episcopal Zion Church in the neighborhood from 1847 to 1849.

=== Decline and urban renewal ===
The neighborhood experienced a long decline beginning in the late 19th century as affluent families moved to newer developments on the city's east side. By the mid-20th century, many of the grand homes had been subdivided into apartments or fallen into disrepair.

The 1960s urban renewal era proved devastating. The construction of the Inner Loop expressway (Interstate 490) severed Corn Hill from downtown Rochester, and approximately 1,400 housing units were demolished across the neighborhood. The Rochester Institute of Technology, which had operated a 13-acre campus in the area, relocated to suburban Henrietta in 1968, further destabilizing the neighborhood.

=== Preservation and revival ===
Organized preservation efforts began in 1965, when the Landmark Society of Western New York established the Genesee Landmarks Foundation to acquire and restore endangered houses in the Third Ward. The listing of the Third Ward Historic District on the National Register of Historic Places in 1974, followed by the city's local preservation district designation in 1977, provided additional regulatory protections. In November 2023, the National Register boundary was expanded to include additional contributing structures.

The inaugural Corn Hill Arts Festival in 1969 became a catalyst for the neighborhood's revival, drawing visitors and attention to the area's architectural heritage. The festival grew into one of upstate New York's largest annual art fairs, organized by the Corn Hill Neighbors Association.

== Architecture ==
The Third Ward Historic District is notable for its concentration of mid-19th-century residential architecture. Prominent surviving buildings include:

- Campbell-Whittlesey House (1835): a Greek Revival house museum operated by the Landmark Society of Western New York
- Hervey Ely House (c. 1837): a substantial Greek Revival residence
- Jonathan Child Mansion (1837): built for Rochester's first mayor
- Ebenezer Watts House (1825–1827): considered the oldest surviving residential structure in the downtown Rochester area

== Cultural history ==
=== Clarissa Street and jazz ===
Clarissa Street, running along the neighborhood's western edge, was the center of Rochester's African-American cultural life from the 1920s through the 1960s, sometimes called "Rochester's Broadway." The street was home to jazz clubs, including the Pythodd Club and Shep's Paradise, which hosted nationally known performers.

=== Son House ===
Son House (1902–1988), the influential Delta blues musician, lived at 61 Greig Street in Corn Hill for several decades after relocating from Mississippi. He was "rediscovered" in Rochester in 1964 by blues enthusiasts, which led to a celebrated late-career revival. In 2015, the Mississippi Blues Trail dedicated a marker in his honor in Rochester.

== Corn Hill Landing ==
Corn Hill Landing is a mixed-use waterfront development completed in 2005 on the bank of the Genesee River at the neighborhood's eastern edge. The complex includes 127 residential apartments and ground-floor commercial space.

The Corn Hill Navigation Waterfront Center, located at Corn Hill Landing, serves as the home port for the Sam Patch, a replica packet boat that offers excursion cruises on the Genesee River and Erie Canal.

== See also ==
- Rochester, New York
- Genesee River
- Inner Loop (Rochester)
- Campbell-Whittlesey House
- Landmark Society of Western New York
- Son House
