= Corn Hill Arts Festival =

Annual arts festival in Rochester, New York, U.S.

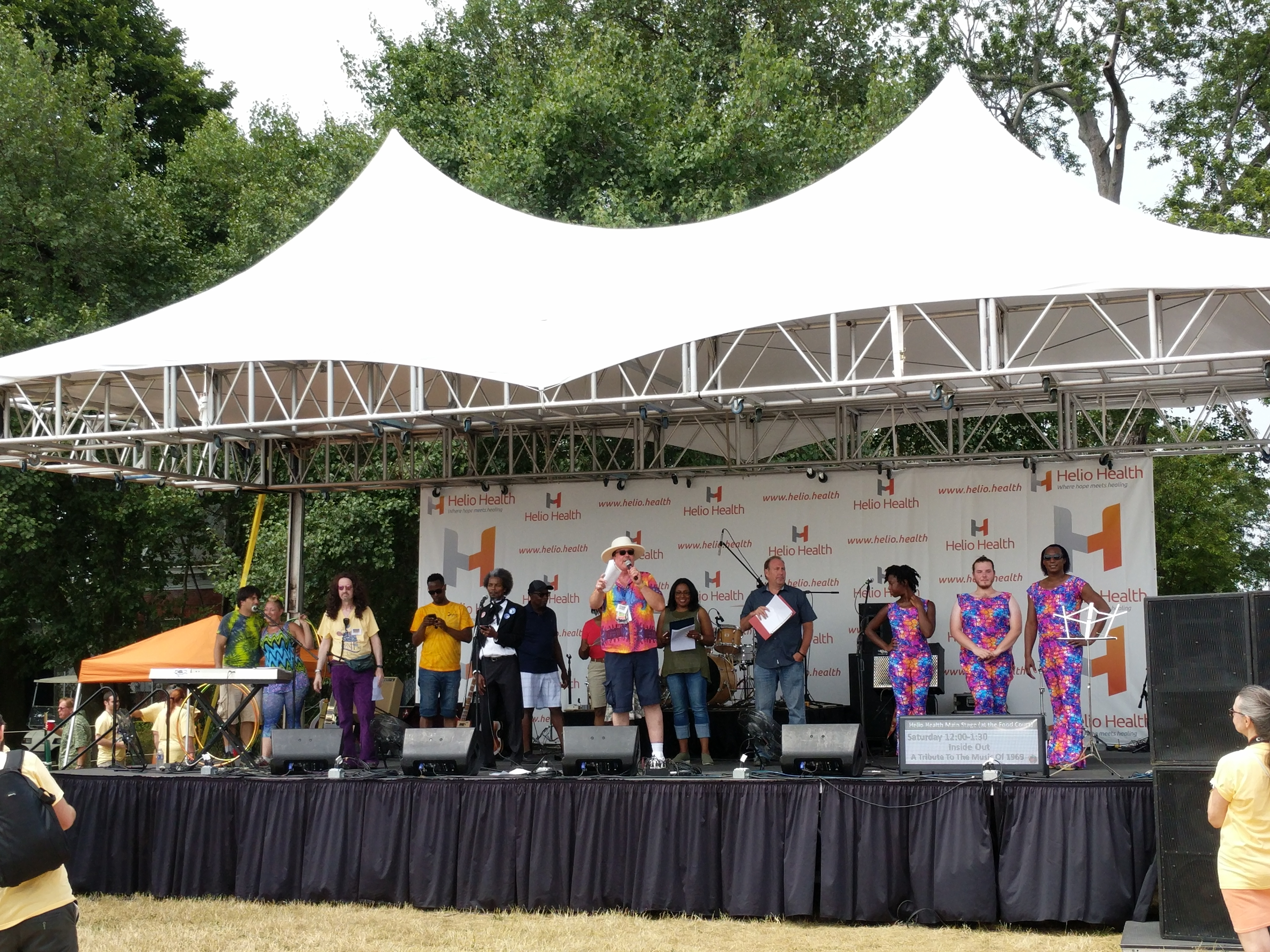
- Main stage at the 2018 festival
- Genre: Arts festival
- Frequency: Annual
- Locations: Corn Hill neighborhood, Rochester, New York
- Coordinates: 43.1444°N 77.6228°W
- Established: August 23, 1969
- Founder: Artists of the Third Ward
- Attendance: 100,000+
- Website: cornhillartsfestival.com

The Corn Hill Arts Festival is an annual arts festival held in the Corn Hill neighborhood of Rochester, New York, United States. First held on August 23, 1969, as the "Greenwood Area Art Show" with approximately 15 artists displaying work on Greenwood Street, it has grown into one of the largest outdoor arts festivals in the northeastern United States, featuring more than 350 artists across nine streets and drawing over 100,000 visitors annually. Admission is free. The festival is organized by the Corn Hill Neighbors Association (CHNA), a not-for-profit volunteer organization.

The festival has been recognized as one of the top 200 festivals in the United States by Sunshine Artist magazine.

== History ==
=== Origins and neighborhood restoration ===
In the late 1960s, the Corn Hill neighborhood, historically known as Rochester's Third Ward, was threatened by urban renewal demolition programs that had already destroyed portions of the surrounding area. Artists living in the neighborhood organized the first "Greenwood Area Art Show" on August 23, 1969, as part of broader efforts to restore and preserve the historic residential district. The first commemorative poster was created by artist Frank Locurcio.

Rochester historian Jim DeVinney has described the festival as having "saved the neighborhood," crediting it with drawing public attention to the architectural and cultural value of the Third Ward at a time when many of its buildings were slated for demolition. The Third Ward Historic District was listed on the National Register of Historic Places in July 1974, five years after the festival's founding.

=== Growth and milestones ===
The festival grew steadily from its origins as a small neighborhood art show into a major regional event. By the early 2000s, it had expanded to span nine streets in the Corn Hill neighborhood and attract tens of thousands of visitors over its two-day run each July.

In 2014, ESL Federal Credit Union became the festival's first-ever presenting sponsor.

The festival celebrated its 50th anniversary in 2018 with special commemorative events. Rochester Contemporary Art Center (RoCo) mounted an exhibition titled "50 Years of Poster Art," showcasing every commemorative poster produced since Frank Locurcio's original 1969 design.

=== COVID-19 cancellations and return ===
The Corn Hill Arts Festival was canceled in both 2020 and 2021 due to the COVID-19 pandemic. The festival returned in July 2022 after a two-year hiatus, drawing thousands of attendees.

== Festival features ==
=== Visual arts ===
The festival features more than 350 juried artists exhibiting and selling work in nine categories, displayed along nine streets in the Corn Hill neighborhood. An Emerging Artist Expo provides exhibition space for newer artists.

=== Music ===
More than 20 live musical performances take place across four stages during the festival, including the Lunsford Circle Gazebo stage.

=== Other activities ===
The festival includes beer and wine gardens, food vendors, and a variety of family activities. Beginning in 2022, the Corn Hill 5K race has been held in conjunction with the festival.

=== Commemorative posters ===
A commissioned commemorative poster has been produced for each edition of the festival since its inaugural year in 1969. The first poster was designed by Frank Locurcio. The complete collection was exhibited at Rochester Contemporary Art Center in 2018 for the festival's 50th anniversary.

== Organization ==
The Corn Hill Arts Festival is organized and produced by the Corn Hill Neighbors Association (CHNA), a not-for-profit volunteer organization dedicated to the preservation and improvement of the Corn Hill neighborhood. CHNA also oversees year-round community activities in the neighborhood, including property maintenance standards and historic preservation advocacy.

== See also ==
- Corn Hill, Rochester, New York
- Rochester, New York
- Park Avenue Festival
- List of festivals in New York
