= Times Square Building (disambiguation) =

Times Square Building may refer to the following buildings:

- The Times Square Building (formerly known as The New York Times Building), the Times headquarters on 43rd Street from 1913 to 2007
- Times Square Building in Seattle, WA (formerly the Times Building), formerly housed editorial operations of the Seattle Times newspaper
- Times Square Building (formerly the Genesee Valley Trust Building) in Rochester, NY
