= Third Ward Historic District =

Third Ward Historic District can refer to the following:

- Third Ward Historic District (Rochester, New York), listed on the NRHP in New York
- Third Ward Historic District (Eau Claire, Wisconsin), listed on the NRHP in Wisconsin
