= Inner Loop (Rochester) =

Freeway in Rochester, New York

Inner Loop
- NY 940T
- Map of Rochester with the remaining portion of the Inner Loop highlighted in red

Route information
- Length: 2.1 mi (3.4 km)
- Existed: 1965–present

Major junctions
- West end: I-490 / NY 15 / NY 31 in Rochester
- I-490 in Rochester
- East end: East Main Street / University Avenue in Rochester

Location
- Country: United States
- State: New York
- Counties: Monroe

Highway system
- New York Highways; Interstate; US; State; Reference; Parkways

The Inner Loop, formerly a complete loop, is now a C-shaped freeway in downtown Rochester, New York, in the United States. Only the portions north of Interstate 490 (I-490) are signed as the "Inner Loop". The official western terminus of the Inner Loop is at I-490 exit 13 in the shadow of Frontier Field west of downtown, while the eastern terminus is at I-490 exits 15 and 16 directly south of downtown on the east bank of the Genesee River. This section of the loop is designated New York State Route 940T (NY 940T), an unsigned reference route, by the New York State Department of Transportation. Although the NY 940T designation is not signed, the road is signed with orange trapezoidal route markers containing the words "Inner Loop" in white.

Construction of the Inner Loop began in the early 1950s—when the city's population was well over 300,000 (33% higher than it was in 2000)—and completed in 1965. Over the past decade, traffic volume has remained constant on the roadway in some areas; however, overall usage from its completion to today has declined as jobs and residents continue to migrate away from the inner city. Between 2014 and 2017, the Inner Loop East project demolished the eastern section of the Inner Loop and replaced it with a surface street; the Inner Loop North project, expected to begin construction in 2027, will demolish the remaining sections north of I-490.

== Route description ==
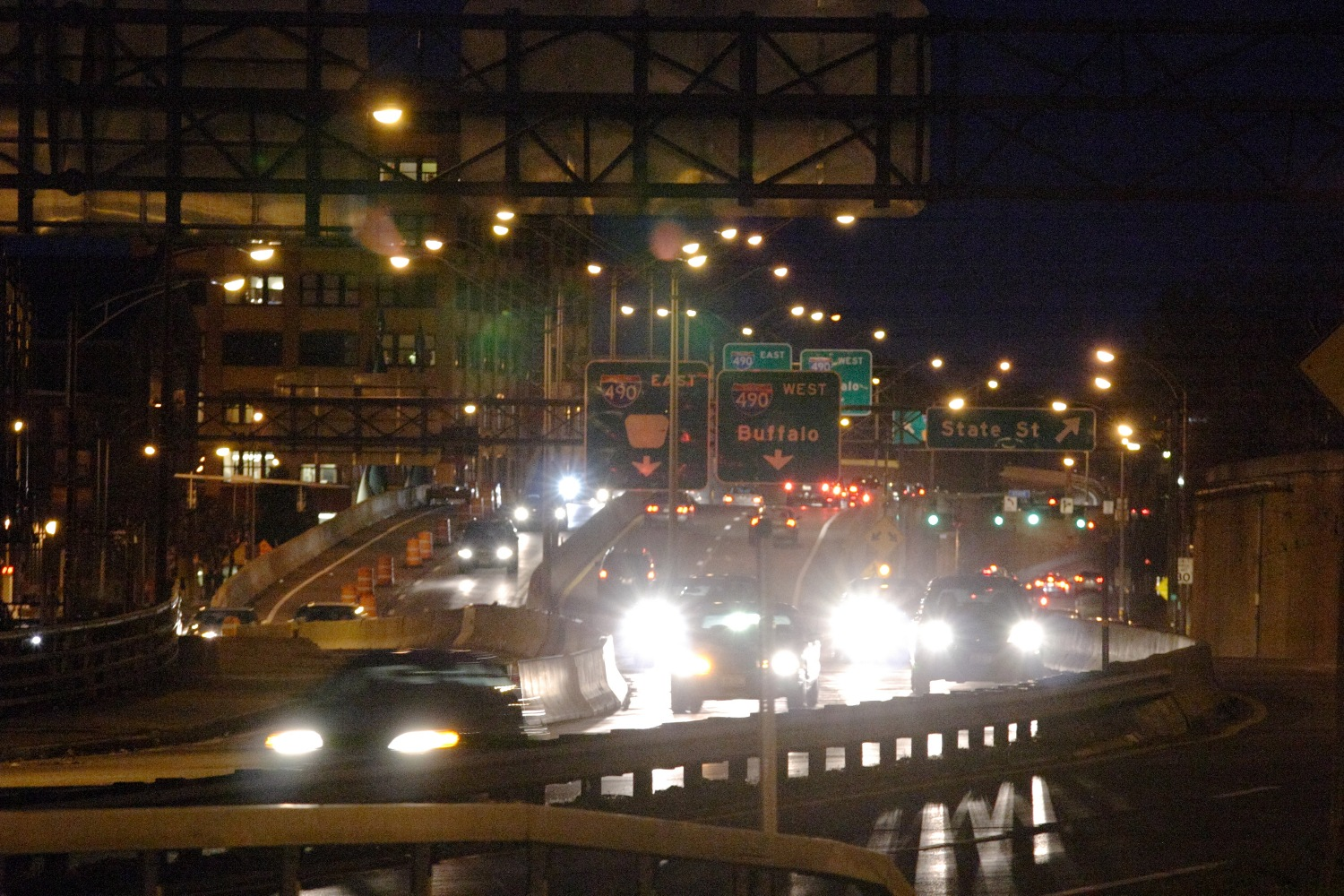
Inner Loop at State Street

The Inner Loop forms a "C" around downtown Rochester, beginning, from west to east, at I-490 exit 13, a directional T interchange adjacent to Frontier Field, the home of the Rochester Red Wings. It heads to the northeast, passing Frontier Field and the High Falls business district as it runs parallel to the CSX Transportation-owned Rochester Subdivision railroad line. About 0.5 miles (0.8 km) from I-490, the Inner Loop and the Rochester Subdivision both cross the Genesee River just south of where the river goes over High Falls. On the other side of the river, the highway turns toward the east, separating from the railroad a short distance southwest of Rochester's Amtrak station on Central Avenue. This is also the location of the first exit on the Inner Loop heading east—with Saint Paul Street and Clinton and Joseph Avenues—and is the beginning of the frontage roads that run parallel to the loop along its length.

East of Joseph Avenue, the route descends below grade-level and begins to run through a cut as it proceeds eastward across the northern edge of downtown. After passing under North Street, the Inner Loop begins to turn southward, connecting with both Scio and East Main Streets in the process. While the interchange with East Main Street is a right exit heading counterclockwise on the loop, it is a left exit heading clockwise, forcing the exit ramp to pass over the loop's counterclockwise lanes in order to reach Main Street. The expressway currently ends there, with a ramp to the right traversing under Main Street to connect with Union Street, which has been widened to replace the former Inner Loop. Prior to 2014, the expressway continued past East (NY 96), Monroe (NY 31), and Clinton (NY 15) Avenues before re-joining I-490, and Union Street was effectively a frontage road.

The Inner Loop was closed and completed by I-490; it once created a continuous beltway of limited-access highways around downtown Rochester. However, the I-490 portion of the loop is signed only as I-490, and the only section of the loop that is signed as the Inner Loop is the 1.4-mile (2.25 km) segment designated as the unsigned NY 940T. Due to its proximity to downtown, the loop creates a division, both physically and sociologically, between downtown Rochester and other neighborhoods. For example, there were only four crossings (underpasses and overpasses) along about a mile of the Inner Loop's eastern side.

== History ==
The inner loop as it was before the eastern section closed in December 2014

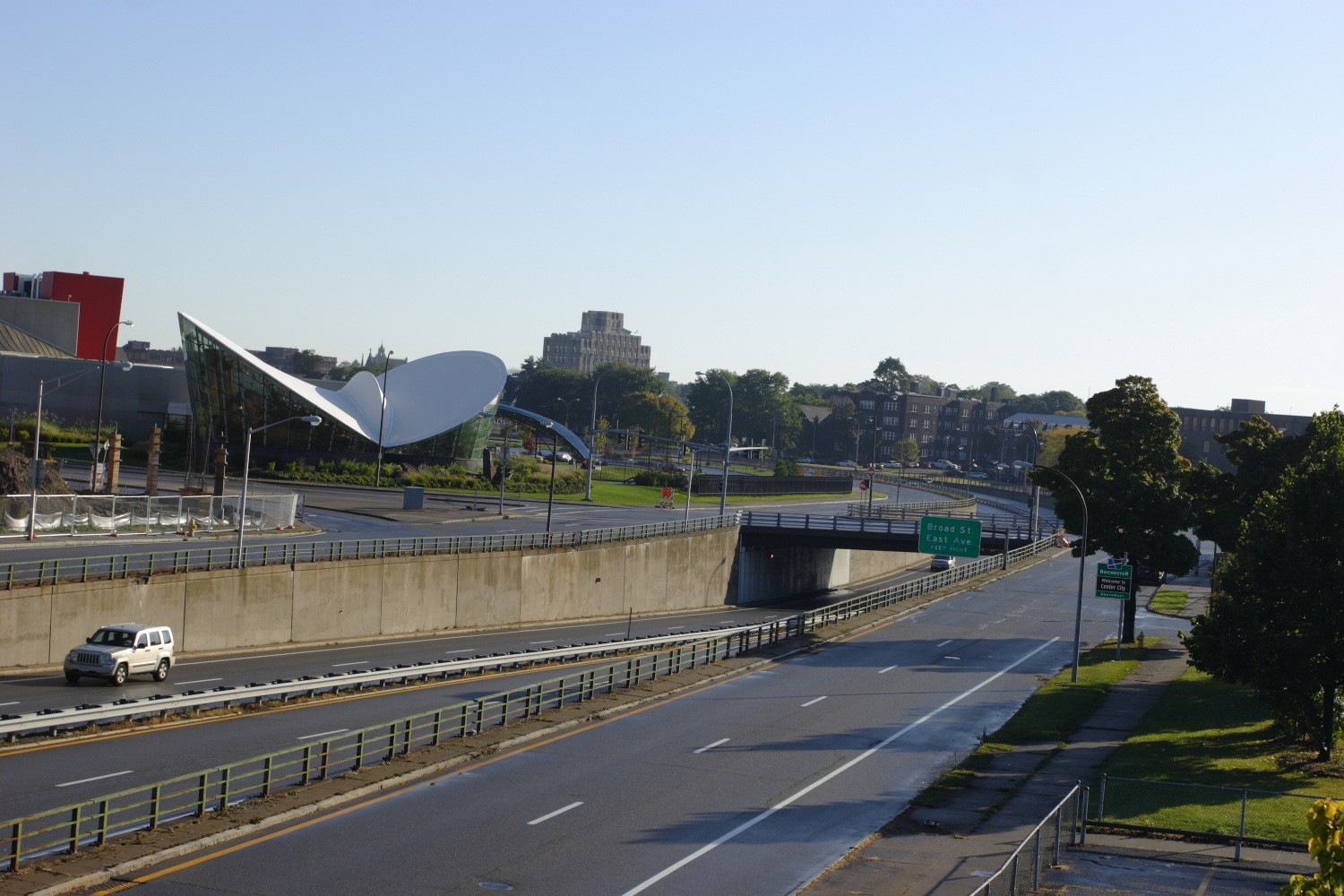
The former portion of the Inner Loop east of Downtown in 2010

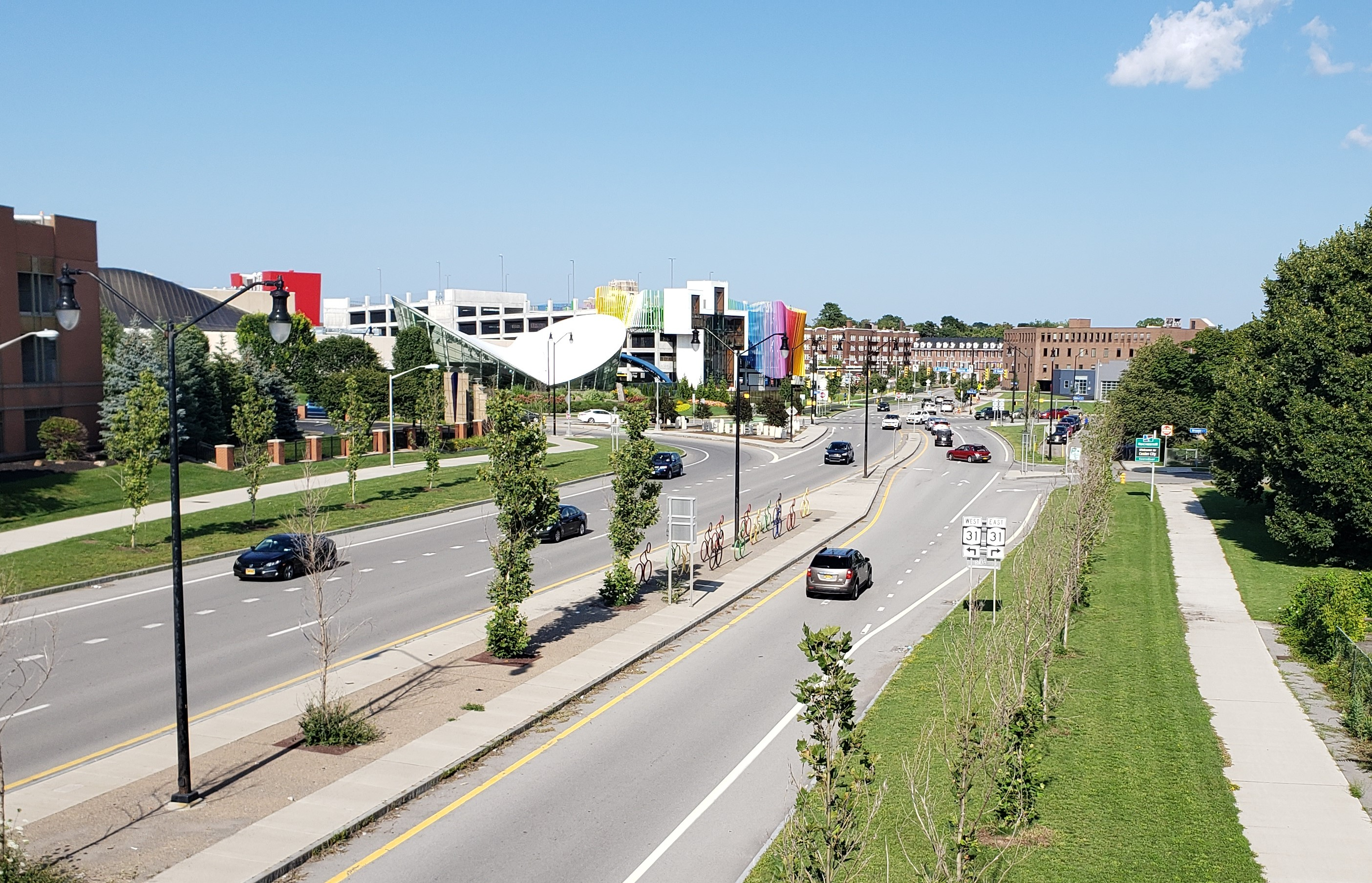
The same portion of the former loop in 2021

The idea for a beltway around Rochester was conceived in the 1950s. At the time, the population of Rochester was roughly 332,000, which translated into poor traffic conditions within downtown. Despite some political obstacles, construction on the highway began in the early 1950s. Many structures were demolished to make way for the route, which was constructed in a cut through the densely populated neighborhoods that surrounded downtown. In 1965, an opening ceremony headlined by then-Governor Nelson Rockefeller officially opened the Inner Loop to traffic. The final price tag on the loop's construction was $34 million (equivalent to $347 million in 2025). The southern part of the Loop was incorporated into the newly constructed I-490 upon completion while the rest is designated as NY 940T, an unsigned reference route.

In the time since the Loop's construction, the population of Rochester has dropped by one-third to 211,328 (as of the 2020 census). While traffic volume on the I-490 and northwestern portions of the loop have remained relatively high, the section east of the Genesee River has seen sharp declines in recent years.

=== Removal of expressway ===
One proposal in 2005, which was considered for federal aid, would have reduced the number of lanes on the loop between Clinton Avenue and Main Street to make room for additional shops and businesses on the streets adjacent to the Inner Loop. Another plan, developed in 2009, called for the portion of the Loop from Main Street to Monroe Avenue (NY 31) to be completely filled in and replaced with an at-grade boulevard. The $20 million project was approved by a city council committee in September 2011; however, a $15 million federal grant application was denied later in the year. Then, in 2012, Rochester Mayor Thomas Richards spent $2 million on further design work that strengthened the city's request for federal funding. On August 30, 2013, the city of Rochester was given a TIGER grant worth $18 million (2013 USD) to fill in the Inner Loop between Monroe Avenue and Charlotte Street. The new project also gave money to reconnect the neighborhoods separated by the Inner Loop, Park Avenue and South Wedge.

The Inner Loop was a prominent feature of "State of the City 2011: In The Loop", a two-month exhibition held by the Rochester Contemporary Art Center in 2011. The event featured various works reflecting on the history of the highway and downtown Rochester and aimed to provoke discussions about the future of the city.

==== Inner Loop East project ====
On December 2, 2014, the Inner Loop's eastern side was closed permanently to start the $21 million Inner Loop East project, which transformed the freeway into an at-grade street. The project was completed on November 22, 2017, at which time the Inner Loop ceased to exist as a complete loop, terminating instead at a signalized intersection with East Main Street and University Avenue. In a 2021 editorial, The New York Times praised the project as an achievement in removing urban highways to improve American cities, noting the project's creation of space for new development.

==== Inner Loop North project ====
Plans to remove a 1.5-mile northern portion of the loop, similar to the eastern removal, have been underway since 2021. The project has the support of U.S. senators Chuck Schumer and Kirsten Gillibrand, and in September 2024 city and state officials jointly applied for a federal Reconnecting Communities Pilot Program grant.

In January 2025, the U.S. Department of Transportation awarded the project $100 million through the Reconnecting Communities Pilot Program, one of the largest grants in the program's history. The project would remove the northern segment of the expressway between I-490 and North Union Street, converting it to a surface boulevard and creating approximately 22 acres of redevelopable land. Construction is expected to begin in 2027.

== Exit list ==
The entire route is in Rochester, Monroe County.

mi	km	Exit	Destinations	Notes
2.1	3.4	15	I-490 east NY 15 / NY 31 (South Avenue)	Western terminus; western end of I-490 concurrency
1.9	3.1	14	Broad Street / Plymouth Avenue – Frontier Field	Eastbound exit and westbound entrance
1.4	2.3	13	I-490 west – Buffalo	Eastern end of I-490 concurrency
1.2	1.9	–	State Street	Westbound exit and eastbound entrance
1.1	1.8	Bridge over Genesee River		
1.0– 0.5	1.6– 0.80	–	Joseph Avenue / Clinton Avenue / St. Paul Street – Downtown	
0.3	0.48	–	Scio Street	Eastbound exit and westbound entrance
0.2	0.32	–	Union Street	Eastbound exit and westbound entrance
0.0	0.0	–	East Main Street / University Avenue	Eastern terminus; at-grade intersection
1.000 mi = 1.609 km; 1.000 km = 0.621 mi: Concurrency terminus; Incomplete access
