= Harts Local Grocers =

Defunct grocery store in Rochester, NY, USA

Coordinates: 43°9′24.0″N 77°35′51.7″W

Hart's Local Grocers
- Industry: Retail, Grocery
- Founded: August 15, 2014; Rochester, NY, United States
- Founder: Glenn Kellogg
- Defunct: March 24, 2019
- Headquarters: 10 Winthrop St, Rochester, NY
- Owner: Rochester Local Capital LLC.

Hart's Local Grocers was an independent grocery store managed by Rochester Local Capital LLC. It was located in the East End Neighborhood in Rochester, NY.

== History ==
The store was named after Hart's Groceries, which had over 100 locations in and around the city Rochester, NY by the 1920s. They were considered one of the first grocers to use store-brand labels and were also the first self-service grocery market. Hart's attracted considerable interest in Downtown Rochester, primarily due to downtown Rochester not having a full-services grocery since the closing of Midtown Market (formerly Wegmans Midtown) in 2002. The store's opening in January 2014 coincided with ongoing efforts to redevelop the former Midtown Plaza site on Main Street and the arrival in the downtown area of thousands of new residents in apartments and condominiums.

Lovely Warren, the Mayor of Rochester, NY, was quoted saying, "For too long, downtown has been a food desert, our East End is already vibrant and the addition of will add to the vitality of the neighborhood". The 20,000-square-foot store carried local produce, dairy, meats and baked goods as well as a wide variety of prepared foods, offering online ordering and online shopping. The grocery, was independently owned and financed in part through a private investor group. The store was located next to the Little Theatre.

On March 11, 2019, it was announced that Hart's would close after five years in business on March 24, 2019, due to declining sales and an inability to find a new owner.
