= Hervey Ely House =

Historic house in New York, United States

- U.S. National Register of Historic Places
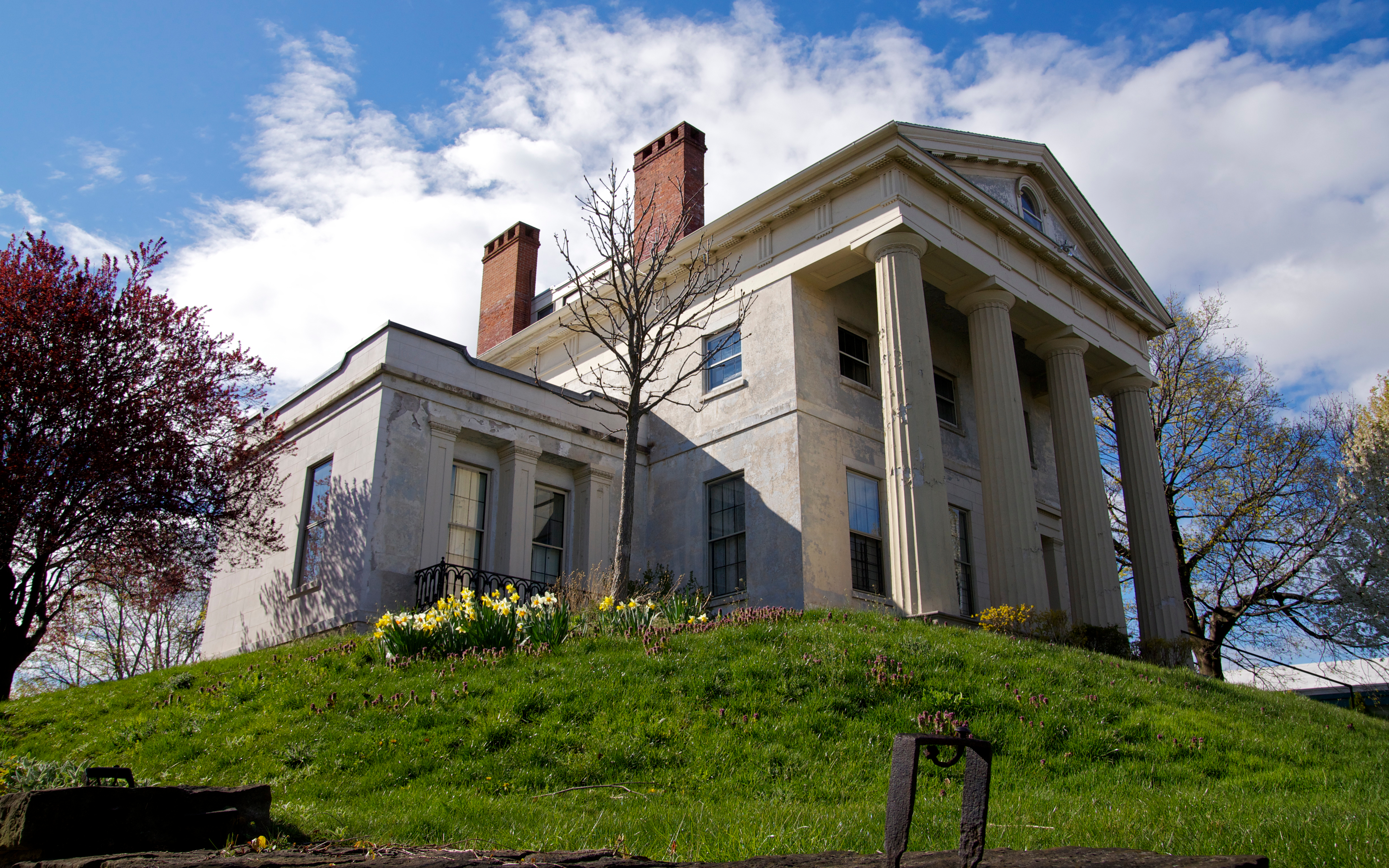
- Hervey Ely House in 2012

- Location within New York Location within the United States
- Interactive map showing the Ely House’s location
- Location: 138 Troup St., Rochester, New York
- Coordinates: 43°9′5″N 77°37′6″W
- Area: less than one acre
- Built: 1837
- Architect: Hastings, Hugh
- Architectural style: Greek Revival
- NRHP reference No.: 71000544
- Added to NRHP: August 12, 1971

Hervey Ely House, also known as the Daughters of the American Revolution Chapter House, is a historic home located at Rochester in Monroe County, New York. It was built around 1837 in the Greek Revival style.

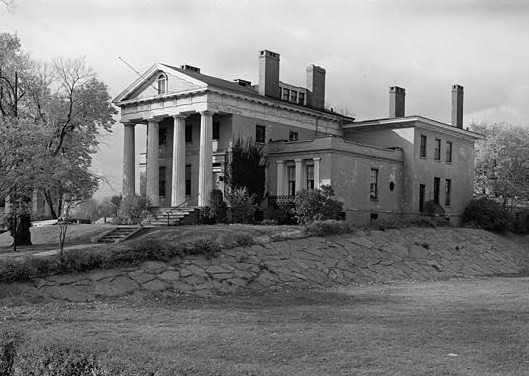
The Hervey Ely House in 1967

The house has been owned since 1920 by the Irondequoit chapter of the Daughters of the American Revolution.

It is located within the boundaries of the Third Ward Historic District. It was listed in the National Register of Historic Places in 1971.

== History ==
=== Third Ward Historic District Rochester, New York ===
The Hervey Ely House is located on Troup Street in the Third Ward Historic District of Rochester, New York. The house greatly impacted the architecture that emerged around it, with the Greek Revival style becoming prevalent during the early 19th century.

The Third Ward was formerly called the “Ruffled Shirt Ward”, and is currently referred to as “Corn Hill”. Housing shortages arose after Rochester’s founding in 1817 due to the city's rapid population growth. The city temporarily combatted the shortage by building houses outward from the center of the city. The Third Ward became a thriving social site due to wealthy house owners hosting parties and galas, and the emergence of clubs. In addition, the Female Charitable Society was founded in 1820, becoming a social gathering and service opportunity for the women in the Ward. Many private schools were established as well.

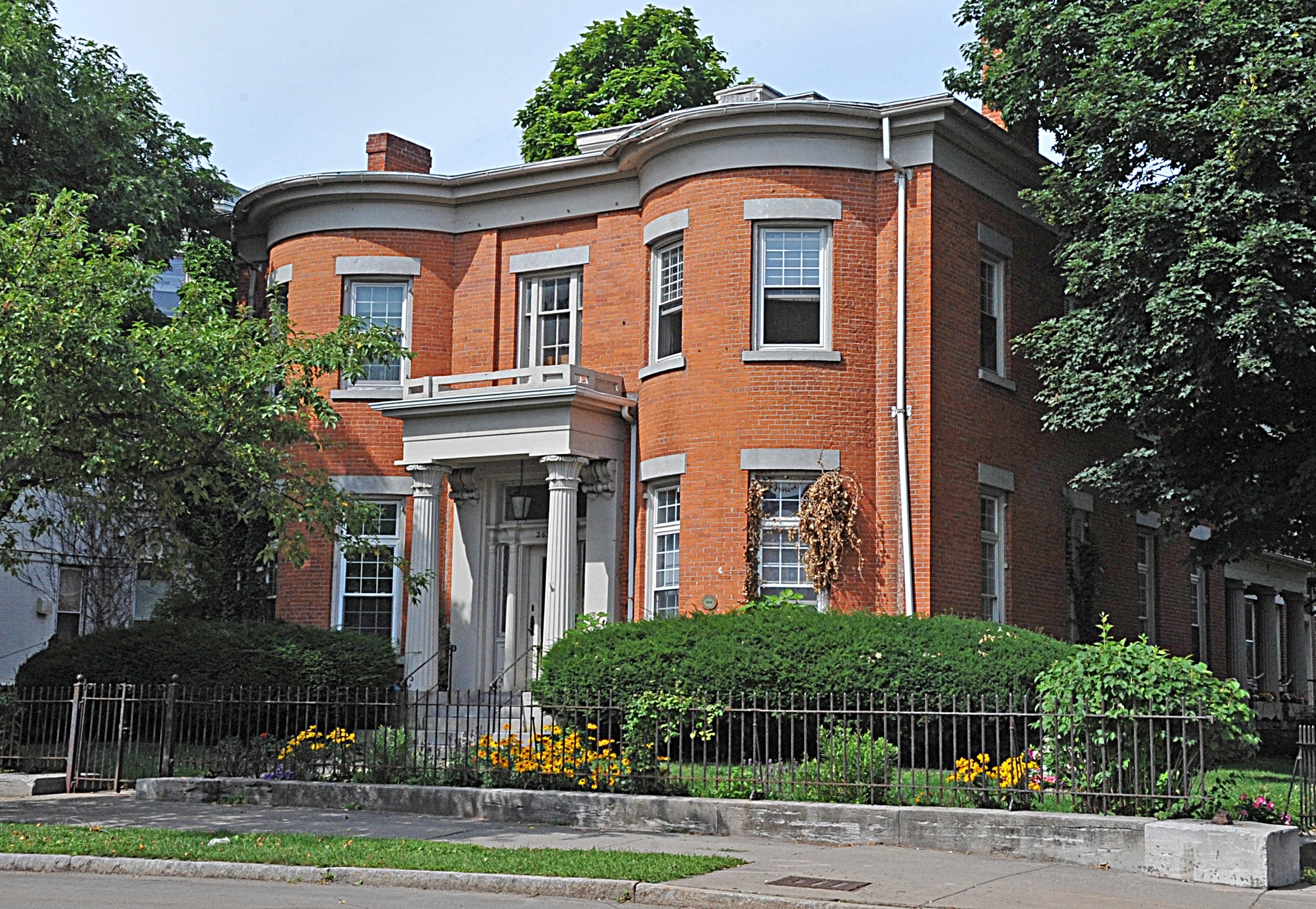
An image from a house located in the Third Ward Historic District in Rochester, New York.

Many of the city's new settlers were immigrants who could not speak English, being Eastern Jews, Italians, Greeks, and Ukrainians. Householders in Rochester were unwilling to rent to them, and rent prices increased rapidly, leading to the rise of slum-like settlements in the Seventh Ward. To confront the housing problem, the Third Ward Renewal Plan and public housing projects were introduced in the early 1900s. Small cottages and houses were sold at moderate prices and old architecture was preserved. However, this plan pushed out African American families and led to riots in the Third and Seventh Wards after the plans were enacted.

=== Hervey Ely House ===
Hervey Ely was the owner of many gristmills, most notably the Red Mills, and the original owner of the Hervey Ely House. He was 22 years old when he moved to Rochester in 1813 and started a sawmill on the Genesee River. After success with the sawmill, he transitioned into flour milling, erecting mills across the Erie Canal. With the wealth accumulated from his business, he and his wife, Caroline, bought a Greek Revival-style mansion located by Livingston Park in Monroe County, New York, in 1837 designed by the architect, Hugh Hastings. Hastings was known for his Greek Revival architecture.

In 1842, flour prices dropped, leaving Ely on the verge of bankruptcy. He sold the house, which was then occupied by Reverend Henry John Whithouse. Following Whitehouse, the mansion was successively occupied by William Kidd, Azariah Boody and Howard Osgood, until it was acquired by the Daughters of the American Revolution in 1920, who turned it into a museum for historical artifacts and documents, such as a drum from a sixteen-year-old drummer who worked on Washington’s Life Guard for about four years.

== Architecture ==
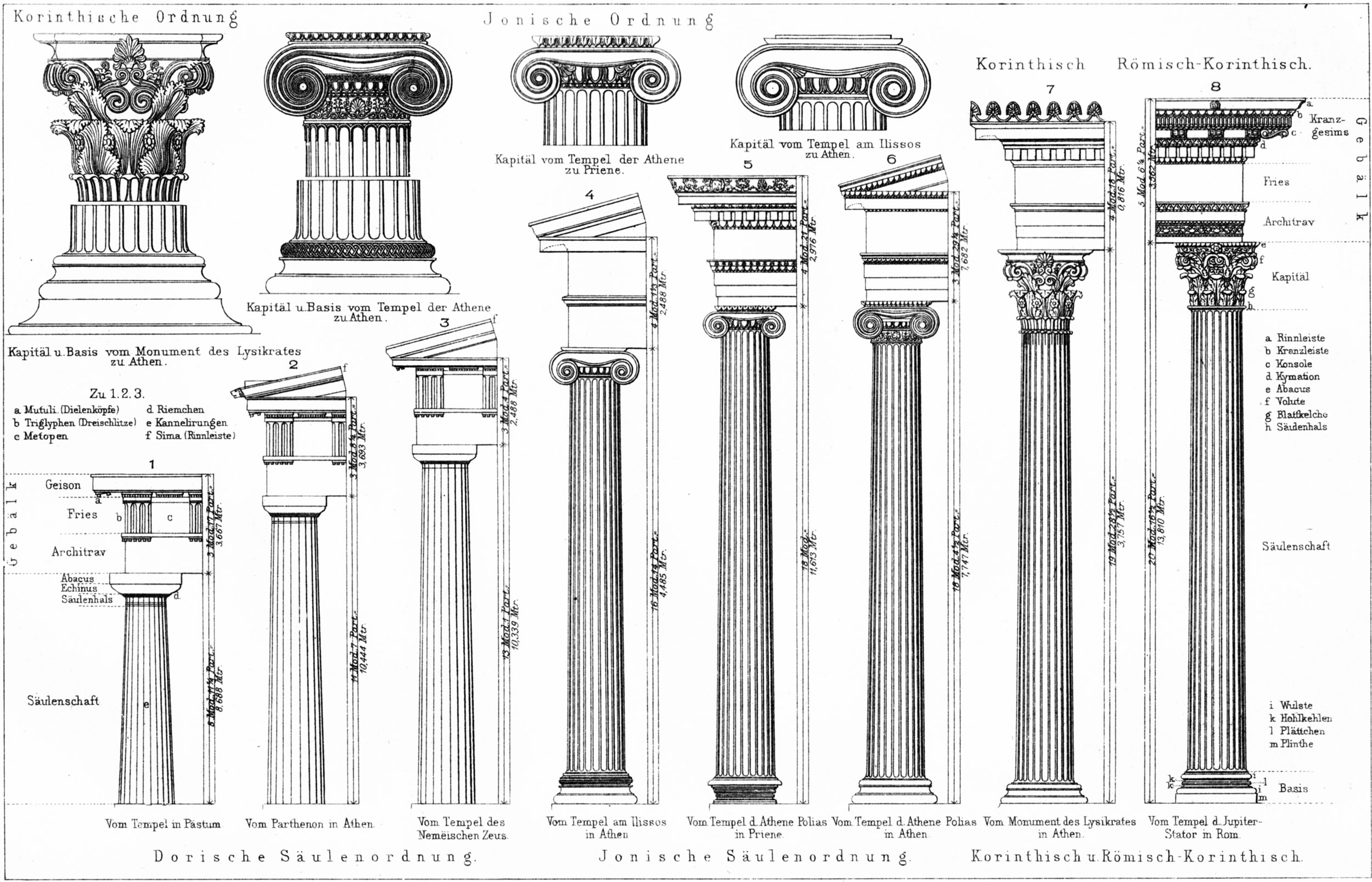
Types of Greek columns that inspired the creation of the Greek Revival style in America in the early 19th century.

The Hervey Ely House is constructed in the Greek Revival style. This type of architecture was popular in the early 19th century, primarily in the Northeast, more specifically, New York. This style is modeled after many popular Greek buildings like the Parthenon, and Odeon of Herodes Atticus, as well as temples. This style is characterized by large Greek columns, pediments, porticoes, and wide friezes.

The Hervey Ely House was designed by Hugh Hastings. It is a 2½ story brick structure covered in stucco. It features twelve foot ceilings, 6,597 square feet of open space, Doric columns, a circular staircase and marble fireplaces.

== Impact ==
The Hervey Ely House has been a part of American and New York history since its construction in 1837, and helped enable the rise in popularity of the Greek Revival architectural style in the region. First designed as a home, the house was later adapted to serve as a museum for historical artifacts and documents by the Daughters of the American Revolution association. The alterations still stand today and have not been modified since 1920.

The Hervey Ely House is still open and available for tours. Other locations covered during the tour include the Shaw House/Schoeniger Home, the Immaculate Conception Church, and the Fenner House/Cornhill Bell Home.
