= Campbell–Whittlesey House =

Historic house in New York, United States

- U.S. National Register of Historic Places
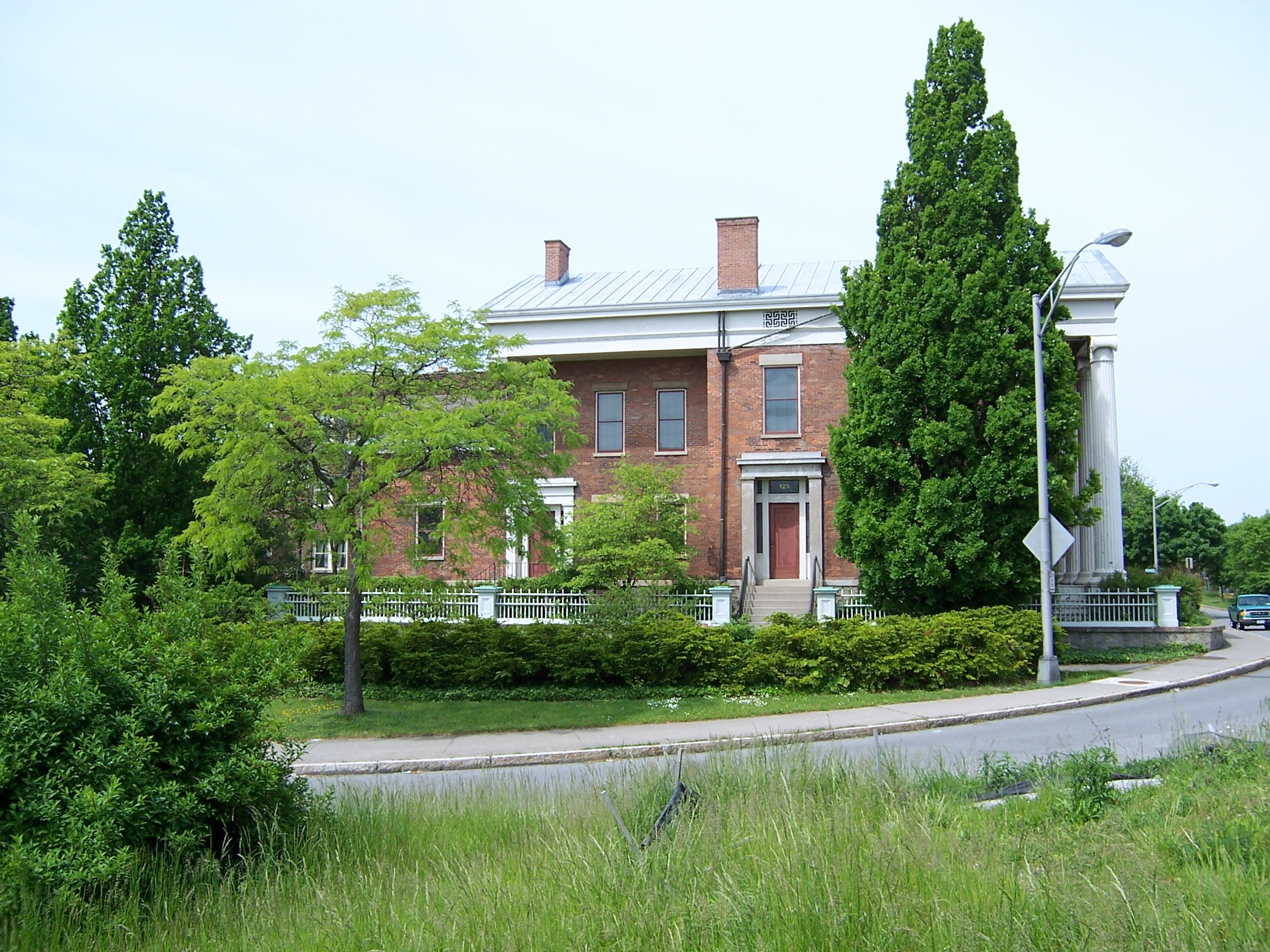

- Location within New York Location within the United States
- Location: Rochester, New York
- Coordinates: 43°9′4″N 77°36′45″W
- Area: 0.2 acres (0.081 ha)
- Built: 1836
- Architect: Lafever, Minard
- Architectural style: Greek Revival
- NRHP reference No.: 71000542
- Added to NRHP: February 18, 1971

The Campbell–Whittlesey House, also known as the Benjamin Campbell House, in Rochester, New York is a historic Greek Revival home, designed by architect Minard Lafever. It was built in 1836, and added to the National Register of Historic Places on February 18, 1971.

Campbell was a flour miller, as were many of Rochester's first residents. The home featured parlors painted in a dozen different colors and furniture stenciled with gold.

From 1939 until July 2010, the house served as a museum operated by the Landmark Society of Western New York. In February 2010, the Society announced plans to sell the house to private interests, saying it would close as a museum by July 1. The Landmark Society cited decreased attendance—school visits, for example, decreased from 1,300 students in 2003 to 300 in 2009—and the society's shifting mission as explanations for the decision.

It is located within the boundaries of the Third Ward Historic District.
