= Times Square Building (Rochester) =

- U.S. National Register of Historic Places
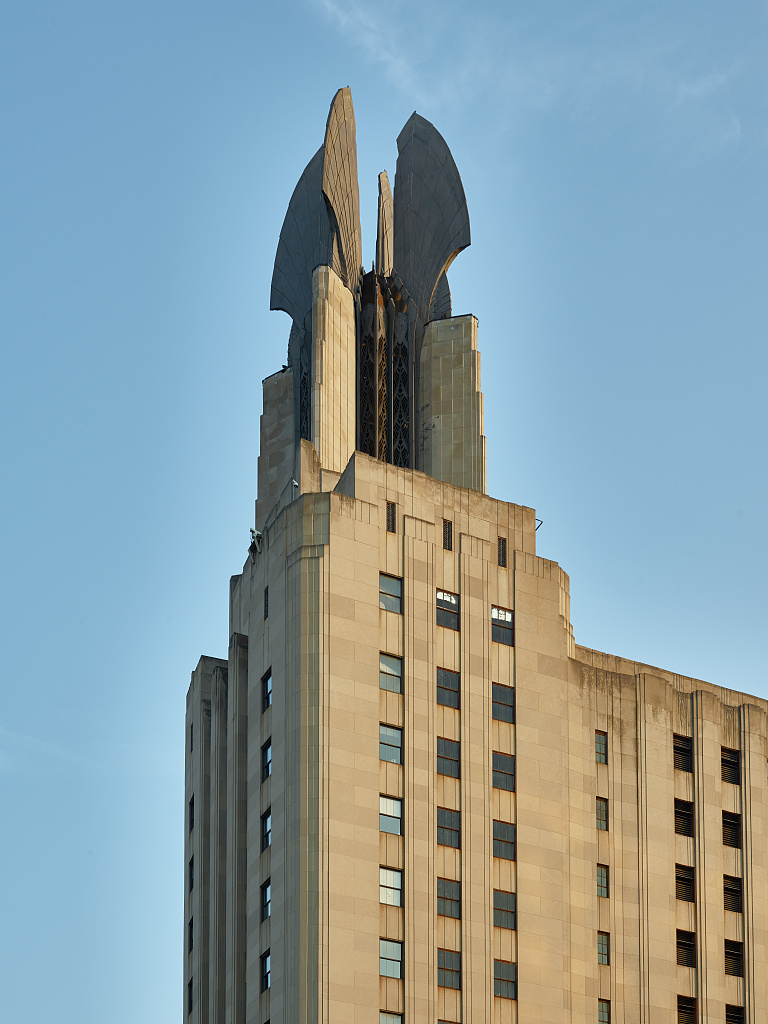
- Times Square Building, February 2025

- Location within New York Location within the United States
- Location: 45 Exchange Blvd, Rochester, New York
- Coordinates: 43°9′16.9″N 77°36′45.4″W
- Area: 110,820 square feet (10,296 m^{2})
- Built: 1929–1930
- Architect: Ralph Thomas Walker (Voorhees, Gmelin, and Walker)
- Architectural style: Art Deco
- Website: Official website
- NRHP reference No.: 14000767
- Added to NRHP: August 11, 1982

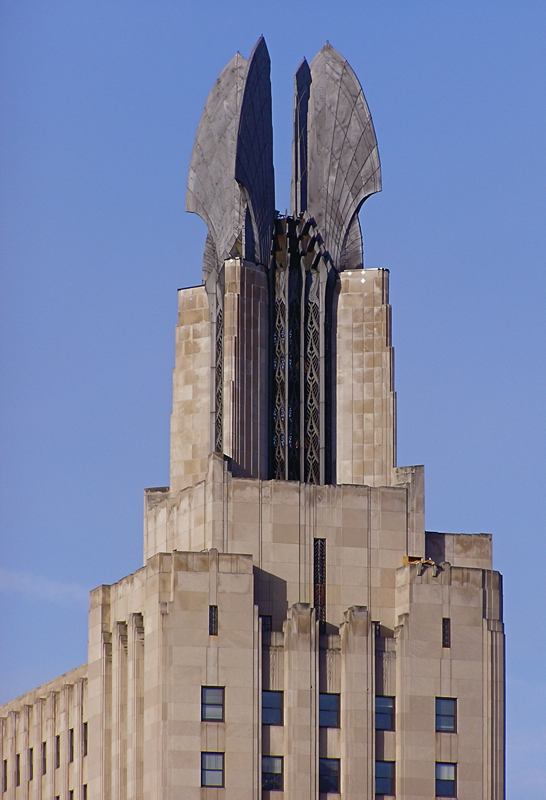
Detail of building showing "The Wings of Progress"

The Times Square Building (originally the Genesee Valley Trust Building) is an Art Deco skyscraper located at 45 Exchange Boulevard in the Four Corners district of downtown Rochester, New York, United States. Designed by Ralph Thomas Walker of the firm Voorhees, Gmelin, and Walker and completed in 1930, the building stands 260 feet (79 m) tall with 14 above-ground floors and a basement, containing approximately 110,000 square feet (10,000 m^{2}) of total space. It is the eighth-tallest building in Rochester. Topped by four monumental aluminum "Wings of Progress," the building is one of the most recognizable landmarks on the Rochester skyline.

== History ==
=== Construction and early years ===
The building was commissioned as the headquarters of the Genesee Valley Trust Company, a Rochester bank. Construction was carried out by A. Friederich and Sons, a prominent local general contracting firm, at a reported cost of $1.5 million. During construction, the firm pioneered a trolley method for conveying the Indiana limestone slab facings into position. The cornerstone was laid on October 29, 1929—"Black Tuesday" of the 1929 stock market crash—and the building was completed the following year. A copper time capsule containing items from 1929 was sealed on September 29, 1930; it is intended to be opened on September 29, 2029.

=== Naming and later use ===
The Genesee Valley Trust Company occupied the building until the early 1960s, when it merged with another bank and vacated the premises. In 1955, the building was sold to 45 Exchange Street, Inc. and renamed the Times Square Building. The building subsequently passed through several owners and tenants. For approximately two decades beginning in the early 2000s, the property was managed by owner Rich Calabrese, who oversaw careful restoration of original details including light fixtures, terrazzo floors, wood paneling, bas-relief plaster, marble fireplaces, decorative ceilings, and Art Deco metalwork. The exterior lighting for the Wings of Progress and its limestone base were also restored during this period.

In 2025, GVT Owner LLC, an entity associated with the Lahinch Group of Syracuse, announced plans for a $30 million historic certified renovation to convert the upper floors into 90 residential units and upgrade 15,000 square feet (1,400 m^{2}) of office and commercial space. The project received $2 million in funding from the Restore New York Community Initiative.

== Architecture ==
=== Exterior ===
The building is a steel-framed structure with concrete floor slabs and a non-load-bearing Indiana limestone facade rising over a low granite plinth. Bas-relief stone carvings designed by the sculptor Leo Friedlander flank the main entrance, which features glass doors with verdigris-colored metal frames surmounted by four tall glass panels. Friedlander was one of the leading American sculptors of the early twentieth century, whose other works include the equestrian groups The Arts of War at the Arlington Memorial Bridge in Washington, D.C. and relief panels at Rockefeller Center. Three central bays of windows, framed by vertical pillars rising from the spandrels of the third floor, emphasize the building's height.

==== Wings of Progress ====
The building's most distinctive feature is the "Wings of Progress," four monumental aluminum wing-shaped structures mounted atop the roof. Each wing stands 42 feet (13 m) high and weighs 12,000 pounds (5,400 kg). Walker was reportedly inspired by seashells he found on a beach; the forms suggest motion and uplift, consistent with the Art Deco movement's celebration of modernity and machine-age optimism. The wings rest on a support of Indiana limestone and a podium of perforated metal screens, and together with the building rise nearly 260 feet (79 m) from the sidewalk. They are among the most iconic images of the American Art Deco movement and remain one of the most distinctive features of the Rochester skyline.

=== Interior ===
The interior features extensive trompe-l'oeil decoration, with stylized wheat motifs throughout referencing Rochester's historical role as "the Flour City." The ceiling of the original main banking hall included hand-painted abstract geometric ornaments interweaving with stylized wheat stalks. The walls of the main level are clad in marble from Valencia, Spain and Lombardy, Italy, and the original banking room featured red marble and Australian lacewood wall panels.

The chandelier and lighting fixtures were designed by Edward F. Caldwell & Co., the premier American designer and manufacturer of electric light fixtures from the late nineteenth to the mid-twentieth centuries. The firm's other commissions included fixtures for the White House, the Waldorf-Astoria, Rockefeller Center, and the New York Public Library.

The southeast corner of the main floor was designed as the bank president's suite and includes an antique marble fireplace taken from central France. The basement once functioned as a safe deposit department with two vaults for securities, including an escape route; the main vault, which remains intact, weighs 38 tons, with the door alone weighing 16 tons.

The building originally hosted a Depression-era mural titled Rochester Past, Present, and Future by Rochester painter Carl William Peters (1897–1980), on exhibit from the building's opening. The mural was long believed to have been destroyed, though recent speculation suggests it may survive beneath drywall.

== Peregrine falcons ==
A nesting box for peregrine falcons has been installed atop the Times Square Building. Rochester has been home to peregrine falcons since the early 1990s, when the New York State Department of Environmental Conservation began a recovery program for the species, which had been devastated by DDT. The nesting box was relocated to the Times Square Building after the original site at the Kodak Tower became unavailable; a second box was installed at the Powers Building. In 2010, the falcon pair Beauty and Archer became the first to successfully hatch eggs at the Times Square Building nest. As of 2025, the resident pair, named Nova and Neander, have nested atop the building since 2022; the nest is monitored by the R Falcon Cam, a livestream project supported by the Genesee Valley Audubon Society. Many of the peregrines raised in Rochester have established nests throughout the northeastern United States and Canada, contributing to the species' ongoing recovery.

== See also ==
- List of tallest buildings in Rochester, New York
- Ralph Thomas Walker
- Leo Friedlander
- Edward F. Caldwell & Co.
