= Third Ward Historic District (Rochester, New York) =

Historic district in New York, United States

- U.S. National Register of Historic Places
- U.S. Historic district
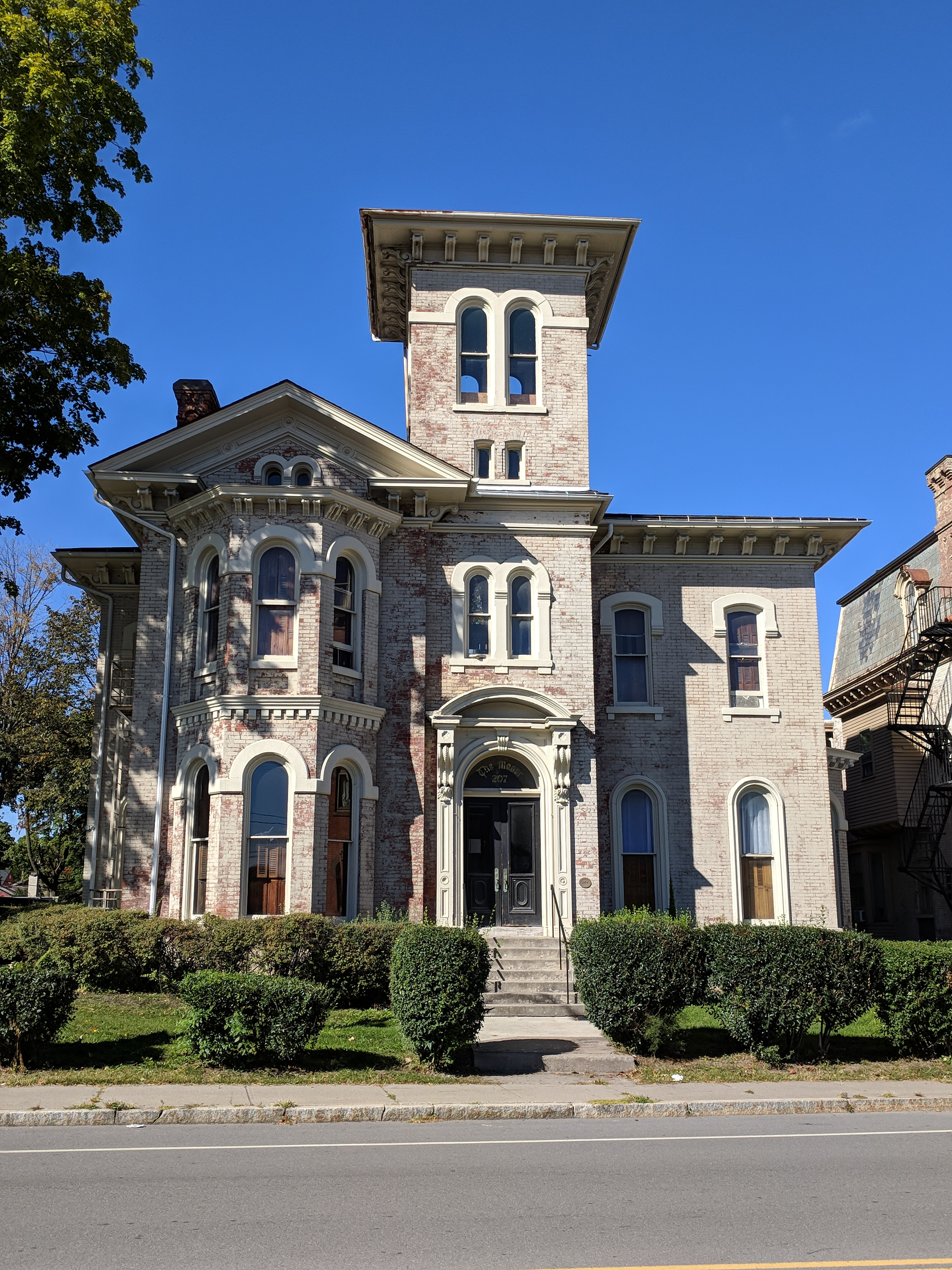

- Location within New York Location within the United States
- Location: Roughly bounded by Adams and Peach Sts., I-490, and both sides of Troup and Fitzhugh Sts., Rochester, New York
- Coordinates: 43°9′1″N 77°36′56″W
- Area: 35 acres (14 ha)
- Architect: Multiple
- Architectural style: Greek Revival, Gothic, Italian Villa
- NRHP reference No.: 74001262 (original); 100009601 (increase)

Significant dates
- Added to NRHP: July 12, 1974
- Boundary increase: November 30, 2023

Third Ward Historic District is a national historic district located at Rochester in Monroe County, in the U.S. state of New York. When first listed, the district consisted of approximately 126 structures in a well known enclave of primarily Victorian homes. Located in the district are the separately listed Campbell-Whittlesey House and Hervey Ely House.

It was listed on the National Register of Historic Places in 1974, with a boundary increase in 2023.
