= Rochester Contemporary Art Center =

- Established: 1977
- Location: 137 East Ave; Rochester, New York 14607
- Coordinates: 43.1565°N 77.6008°W
- Type: Art museum
- Director: Bleu Cease
- Public transit access: Rochester Transit Service
- Website: http://www.rochestercontemporary.org/

The Rochester Contemporary Art Center is a non-profit art center located in Rochester, New York's East End District. The art center is a venue for the exchange of ideas and a not-for-profit 501(c)(3) that was founded in 1977. As a center for contemporary art, it provides encounters for audiences and opportunities for artists. The center exhibits and supports contemporary art of all forms and is well known for its annual 6x6 exhibition. The art center is also known for its popular Makers & Mentors Exhibitions, which combines notable educators with their current and former students. The State of the City exhibitions focus on new urbanism and feature artists from across the region. The organization hosts numerous other curated group exhibitions, collaborations with arts organizations of all kinds, and community-based projects.

== History ==
Founded as Pyramid Arts Center in 1977 by Tony Petracca and Gina Mosesson, the center was located in several different storefronts and warehouse spaces around Rochester. In 2001, the organization rebranded and moved to its current location in Rochester's East End District. In 2007, it initiated First Friday, a monthly citywide gallery night involving up to thirty other art venues throughout the city of Rochester. In December 2012, the center announced the purchase of its 137 East Ave. facility and the launch of their first-ever capital campaign, The Future Fund.

The Rochester Contemporary Art Center currently has over 850 members, about 60% of which are artists. Member artists participate in an annual Members' Exhibition.

The center exhibits several exhibitions in its main gallery per year in addition to hosting 18-20 smaller exhibitions, performances and events.

== 6x6 ==
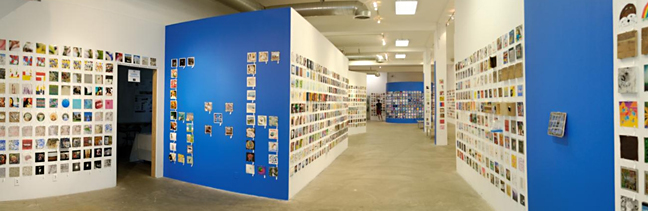
6x6x2011 at Rochester Contemporary Art Center

In 2008, the Rochester Contemporary Art Center launched what has become a growing international small art phenomenon known as 6x6. Each year, 6x6 returns with thousands of original artworks, made and donated by celebrities, international and local artists, designers, college students, youths, and others. Each artwork is 6x6 square inches, signed only on the back, and exhibited anonymously. All entries are accepted, exhibited and are available for sale to the public for $20 each (in the gallery and online for global purchasing) to benefit the center. Artist names are revealed to the buyer upon purchase. There is no fee to enter in the International Small Art Phenomenon.

Previous submissions include artworks from George Condo, Andrea Barrett, Wendell Castle, Garth Fagan, Philip Glass, Albert Paley, Joel Seligman, Louise Slaughter, Lovely A. Warren, and Danny Wegman.

== See also ==
- Rochester's Culture and Recreation
- List of museums in New York
- Memorial Art Gallery
