= Edgerton (neighborhood) =

Rochester, NY neighborhood

Coordinates: 43°10′22″N 77°37′58″W

- Rochester Neighborhood
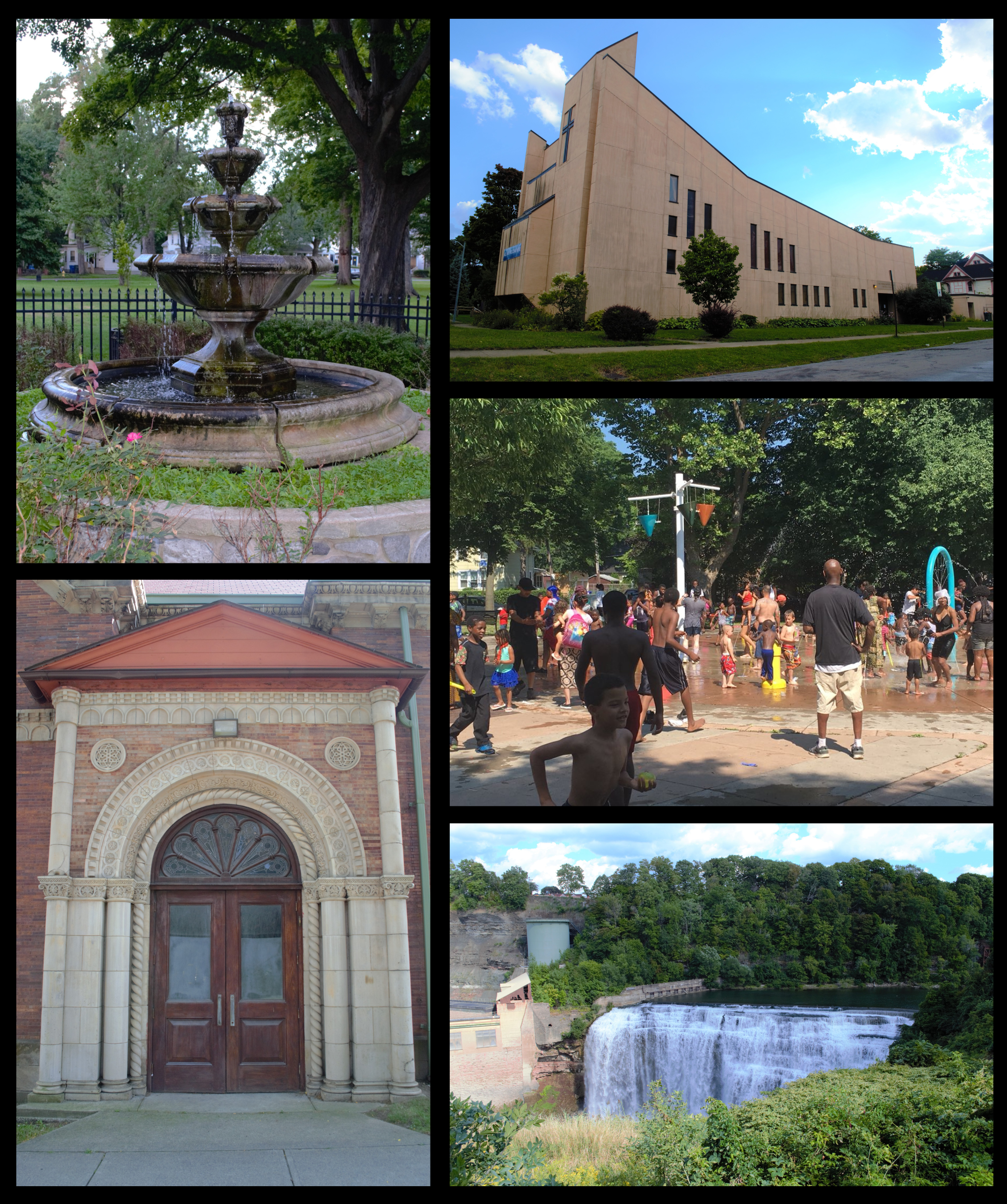
- (left to right, top to bottom) Jones Square Park, Lake Avenue Memorial Baptist Church, Edgerton Park, Lower Falls Park, and Greater Harvest Church
- Nicknames: The Bermuda Triangle, the Ninth Ward, the Tenth Ward
- Interactive map of Edgerton
- Country: United States
- State: New York
- City: Rochester
- Quadrant: Northwest
- Colonized: 1815 (as McCrackenville)
- Organized: 1850 (as the Ninth Ward)
- Recognized: 1961 (as Edgerton)
- Named for: Hiram Edgerton

Area
  - Total: 0.86 sq mi (2.2 km^{2})
  - Rank: 10th

Population (2020)
  - Total: 7,369
  - Rank: 7th
  - Density: 8,890/sq mi (3,430/km^{2})
  - Rank: 10th
- Demonym: Edgertonian

Demographics
  - Black: 48.4% (12th)
  - Hispanic (non-White): 19.5% (6th)
  - White: 17.1% (27th)
  - Asian: 15.9% (1st)
  - Mixed race: 5.1% (6th)
  - Other: 0.9% (7th)

Economics
  - Median income: $17,200
  - Rank: 34th (last)
- Time zone: Eastern Standard Time
- ZIP Code(s): 14608, 14613

Edgerton is a neighborhood in the Northwest Quadrant of Rochester, New York that sits between the Genesee River on the east and the Erie Canal bed on the west. One of the city's oldest and largest residential areas, Edgerton is among the most ethnically, linguistically, and racially diverse communities in Western New York. The neighborhood has been called "the Bermuda Triangle of Rochester" because of its "nearly invisible" status in local politics. Edgerton is currently the poorest neighborhood in Rochester, with an unemployment rate higher than that of the United States during the Great Depression.

Edgerton has been one of the largest contributors to Rochester's physical, political, and social landscapes, especially during the neighborhood's time as the "heart of the city" in the 20th century. The home of radicals like Helen Barrett Montgomery and innovators like George Eastman, Edgerton is the birthplace of the first commercially successful flexible film and the modern vocational school. Today, the neighborhood contains the largest urban farm in Western New York, an abundance of public art and innovative architecture, and some of Rochester's most famous parks, such as Edgerton Park and the Frederick Law Olmsted-designed Lower Falls Park and Jones Square Park.

== History ==
=== The Grandest Playground (1400–1860) ===
This was known to us as Burke's Woods. . . . When we lay on the leaf-covered ground and gazed at the fleecy clouds that floated past the openings, we could easily imagine ourselves in Fairyland.

— Rossiter Johnson, The Grandest Playground in the World (1918)

Before the arrival of European colonists, the Onödowáʼga built a village in what is now Edgerton. The residents erected a number of large burial mounds made of sand and clay on the site. Two trails ran north-south through the village, granting people easy access to launching sites for canoes bound for Lake Ontario.

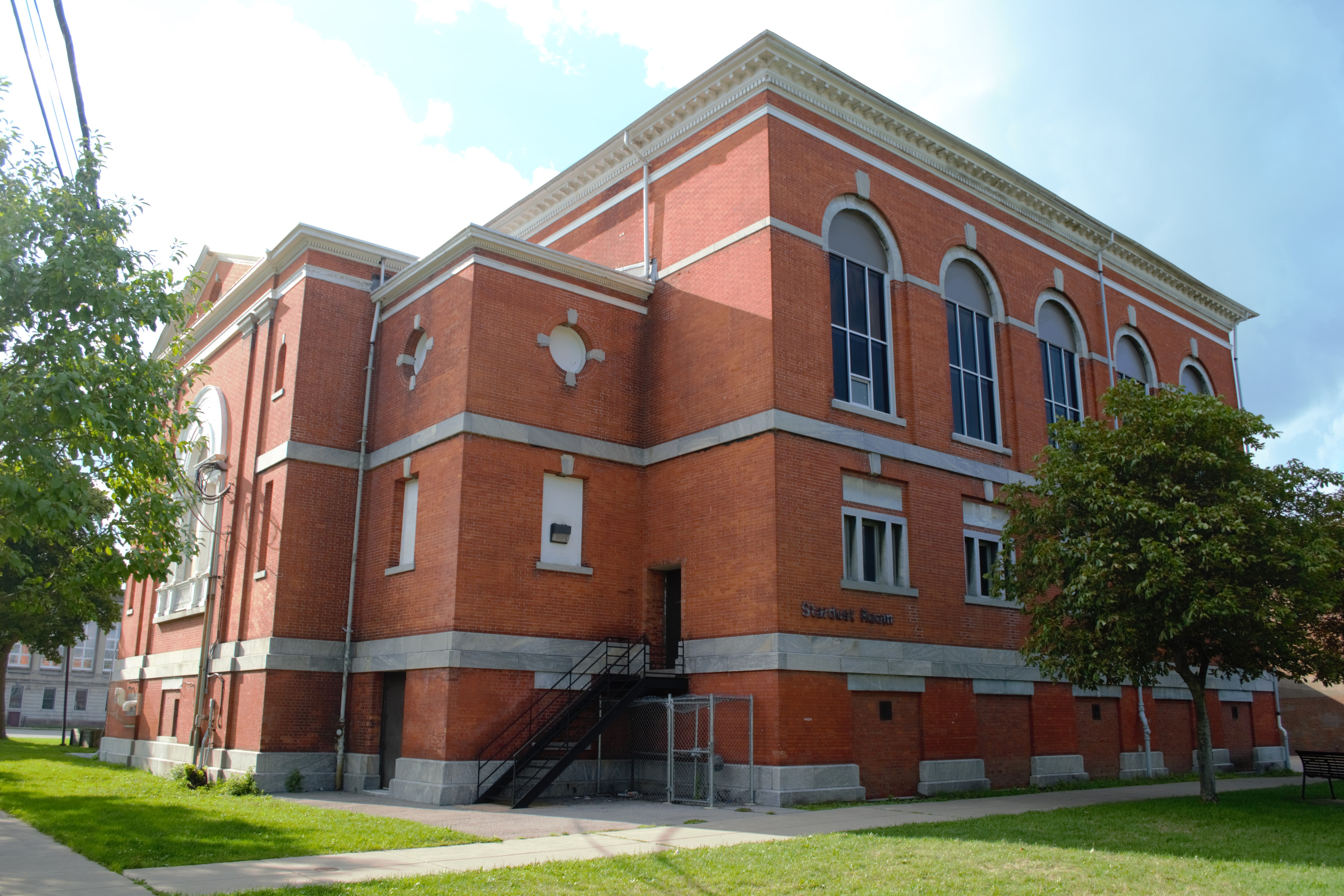
The Edgerton Park Recreation Center is the only remaining piece of the Western House of Refuge that once dominated Edgerton's landscape.

In the late 1700s, the first European colonists built cabins and homes near the village. Over the next five decades, these buildings evolved into a settlement known as McCrackenville, which eventually consisted of a paper mill, a flour mill, a furniture factory, a tannery, and a brewery. Rochester began to slowly creep north until it fully incorporated the industries and land of McCrackenville in the 1850s, placing what is now Edgerton in what was then the last of the City's nine wards; shortly thereafter, the northern half of the neighborhood was placed into a new Tenth Ward.

Edgerton acquired two of its most important geographic and social features during this pre-annexation era. The first was the Erie Canal, the completion of which in 1825 gave Edgerton both its western border and easy access to "The Nation's First Superhighway." The second feature was the Western House of Refuge, built on the east side of the canal in the late 1840s. This first state-run prison for children in the United States, which used a method of juvenile reform built on corporal punishment and penal labor, would become the center of the area's architectural and social landscape.

The hydropower on the neighborhood's east side, the shipping lanes of the Erie Canal on the neighborhood's west, and the open space throughout Edgerton attracted new distilleries, mills, and factories. As businesspeople in the pre-automobile era looked to live near their businesses, Edgerton quickly became filled with the city's new money elite, as the leaders of Kodak, Bausch & Lomb, Hickey Freeman, and the Chamber of commerce all came to call Edgerton home. By the time of the Gilded Age, the neighborhood had become a veritable playground for the antebellum white upper-middle class, thanks to its Episcopal, Baptist, Methodist, and Presbyterian churches, Masonic Temple, literary societies, and a private hospital that provided high-tech (and costly) treatments.

=== A Stronghold of Good Government (1860–1915) ===
Who brought so many jobs to the Tenth Ward? Who brought us all the improvements? It was the people, not the politicians.

— Edgertonian Charles Murphy, The Democrat & Chronicle (July 1919)

By the 1860s, the geographic concentration (and relatively even distribution) of economic power in Edgerton translated into a distinct, neighborhood-based social and political culture. This was largely thanks to Rochester's highly decentralized government structure, which operated as something close to a ward republic. In Rochester, all wards were neighborhoods, and there were no neighborhoods outside of wards. Neighbors joined through drill corps, parade teams, and other ward-based social organizations to rally for and elect ward-based school commissioners, aldermen, and county supervisors. These officials were distinctly neighborhood politicians, who advocated for "the wards which had elected them, rather than for other sections or groups of the city."

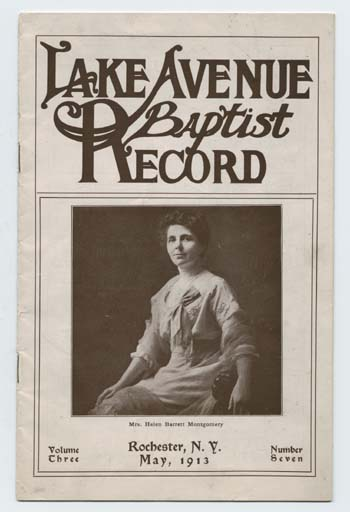
A copy of Lake Avenue Baptist's monthly publication featuring the congregation's preacher, Edgertonian Helen Barrett Montgomery.

In Rochester, poor wards scrapped for basic improvements to their neighborhoods, while the few built-out, "old money" wards focused on cementing their economic advantages while occasionally working to "rescue" the poor from themselves. The Ninth and Tenth wards, where young business tycoons lived next to physicians, plumbers, shoemakers, and janitors, took a middle path. Edgertonians in both wards fought hard for improvements to their own neighborhood, but did so in ways that ensured these beyond-the-basics advantages – like accessible Urban parks, extensive public transit, antimachine politics, and cutting-edge educational reforms – were distributed across the city. As a result, residents like feminist polymath Helen Barrett Montgomery, progressive preacher Clarence Augustus Barbour, and pacifist teetotaler Clinton Norman Howard became "the most active civic reformers" not just in Edgerton, but in Rochester as a whole.

The power of these "Good Government" reformers, channeled and magnified through institutions like the ward structure and the neighborhood's religious and business organizations, not only brought a "new vitality to Rochester," but "enriched the lives of a whole generation." These reformers built a new "progressive wing of the Republican party in Rochester," whose anti-machine stance influenced local, state, and national policies through politician-entrepreneurs like James Johnston, Charles S. Baker, John Van Voorhis, and Lewis Selye. It crossed the Genesee by erecting the steel arch Driving Park Bridge, brought Rochester's first streetcars to Edgerton, and expanded those rail lines into one of the best public transit systems in the city. It drew Frederick Law Olmsted in to redesign Jones Square Park while create Lower Falls Park. And it created feminist organizations like Woman's Educational and Industrial Union, "one of the most significant developments" in Rochester's labor history.

Perhaps the greatest social progress came through neighborhood's approach to the Western House of Refuge, which was relocated out of Edgerton after a state investigation found the purported "school" was a "money-making" operation that was "exceedingly repulsive" in its punishment and torture of children. The prison was replaced physically by what would be known as Edgerton Park, named for the mayor who purchased the land on which it was built. By the 1910s, the 40-acre park contained Rochester's premiere exhibition grounds, first public library, and first municipal museum. On an institutional level, the House was replaced by Vocational schools that were "the first of [their] kind in the country" and a local branch of the YMCA. These advances, as one resident wrote, proved Edgerton was a "stronghold of good government."

=== The Heart of the City (1915–1960) ===
If Edgerton was the heart of the city, Edgerton Park was the heart of the neighborhood.

— The Democrat & Chronicle (August 1982)

The post-war building boom on the east side of Rochester and in suburbs like Gates, Greece, and Irondequoit caused an exodus of middle- and upper-class families from the Ninth and Tenth wards. The pricier nature of these newer homes and builders' use of racially restrictive covenants meant that the suburban frontier was inaccessible to the growing Italian lower middle-class in Rochester. Unwilling or unable to enter the existing Italian neighborhoods of the city's east side, these families streamed into Edgerton, leading it to be called one of Rochester's "Italian ghettos." By the 1930s, Edgerton was almost exclusively Italian-American (with one in four residents being foreign-born, typically from Southern Italy), making the neighborhood "Rochester's claim to a Little Italy." This was largely thanks to the federal government, which built a branch of the Home Owners Loan Corporation in the neighborhood and made the Ninth and Tenth wards the centerpiece of its homeownership-subsidy program in Rochester.

Unlike their forebears who were forced to move into resource-deprived slums, newcomers in Edgerton benefited immensely from the institutional frameworks earlier Ninth and Tenth Warders had left behind. This included the Republican ward establishment, which elected the first Italian-American in Rochester's history in 1915, sent the first Italian-American to the city legislature in 1925, and made Edgerton the "foothold" for Italian-American politics. And unlike the Black and Asian immigrants who would come after them, the Italians of Edgerton were supported by a wealthy institution that poured resources and power into the neighborhood: the Roman Catholic Church. After bringing to Edgerton the first Italian Catholic church in Rochester, St. Anthony of Padua, the Holy See brought established institutions like the Holy Rosary church, rectory, school, and convent, a Carmelite monastery, a Sisters of St. Joseph convent, and a Knights of Malta temple. With these new residents and resources, Edgerton became filled with bakeries, theaters, a Christadelphian church, the headquarters of Lawyers Cooperative Publishing, Chevrolet and Ford dealerships, grocery stores, funeral homes, gas stations, auto repair shops, florists, financial institutions, and other entities that defined a thriving urban neighborhood in the 20th century – including, notably, The Tenth Ward Courier, a community paper that covered local historical, political, and social goings-on into the 1990s.

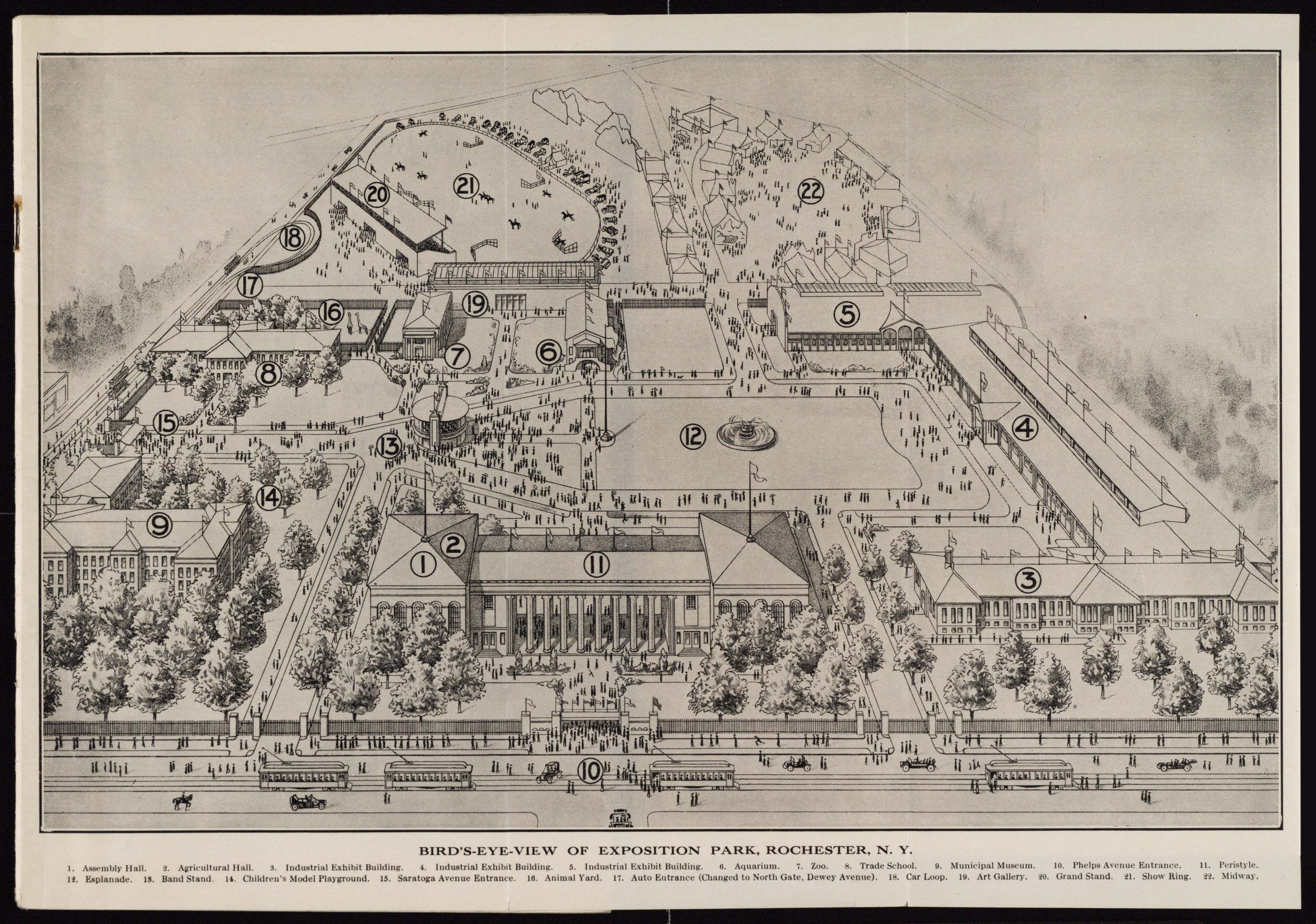
Edgerton Park as it appeared in 1913, just a few years after the City of Rochester acquired it from the State of New York.

Edgerton thrived not only for its new residents, but for the city as a whole. Throughout the first half of the 20th century, Edgerton Park's arena, library, museum, swimming pool, bandstand, sports fields, playground, and zoo were the center of entertainment and recreation for lower- and middle-class Rochesterians. The park hosted trade shows, auto shows, art exhibitions, firework shows, animal shows, rodeos, parades, military demonstrations, annual horse shows that were called the "opening event in Rochester's social season," the massive annual Industrial Expositions, and concerts like an all-Black review led by Duke Ellington. Edgerton Park was home to the Rochester Cardinals of the International Hockey League, the Rochester Jeffersons of the National Football League, and the Rochester Royals of the National Basketball Association, who won the 1951 NBA Finals at the 4,000 seat Edgerton Park Arena. Unsurprisingly, when Rochester built its light rail system in the 1930s, seven of the nine main stops west of the Genesee River were in Edgerton.

Despite its status as a "cradle of culture" in the early-to-mid 20th century, it was during this time that Rochesterians began to develop stereotypes about the neighborhood that have persisted into the present. Just as Italian-Americans began to define the Ninth and Tenth wards, Rochesterians began to embrace what Edgertonians called "the Mafia taint" – the idea that Edgerton was wracked with "brutal crimes," "disorder," "dynamitings," "stabbings," and "extortions." By 1940, the federal government would formally label Edgerton as a "definitely declining" neighborhood, where half of all homeowners were in default on the mortgages and failed to fully take "pride of ownership." These faults of these were, as Rochester historian Blake McKelvey noted, traced less to reality than a widespread perception that Italians were inherently "passionate," "violent," and "volatile." Nevertheless, the federal government believed the neighborhood would "hold its own" into the future because of the high level investment in the area's geographic and institutional infrastructure, especially its "churches," "schools," "streets," and "transportation."

=== A Neighborhood Disassembled (1960–1990) ===
When people don't feel united within political boundaries, you don't develop a community or neighborhood identity.

— Rochesterian Sally Knorr, The Democrat & Chronicle (March 1978)

In the 1960s, Edgertonian's Italian-Americans – no longer a minority according to American racial categorization – began to embrace the phenomenon of white flight, leaving en masse to the nearby suburbs of Gates and Greece. Unlike the outmigrants before them, who left behind a durable, growing infrastructure, Edgertonians who moved out in the mid-20th century pulled up the ladder behind them. With white suburbanites embracing the automobile over metropolitan public transit, the city removed streetcars from Edgerton in the 1940s and the subway at the end of the 1950s. The crowds that once sustained the vast cultural infrastructure of Edgerton Park dried up, as Ninth and Tenth Warders on their own never made up the majority of attendees at the park's events. Rather than driving into the city to attend church, participate in politics, or engage in cultural activities, white Rochesterians chose to build and attend separate, racially homogenous institutions in the suburbs (such as Bishop Kearney High School) or in the easily accessible downtown core (such as the Blue Cross Arena).

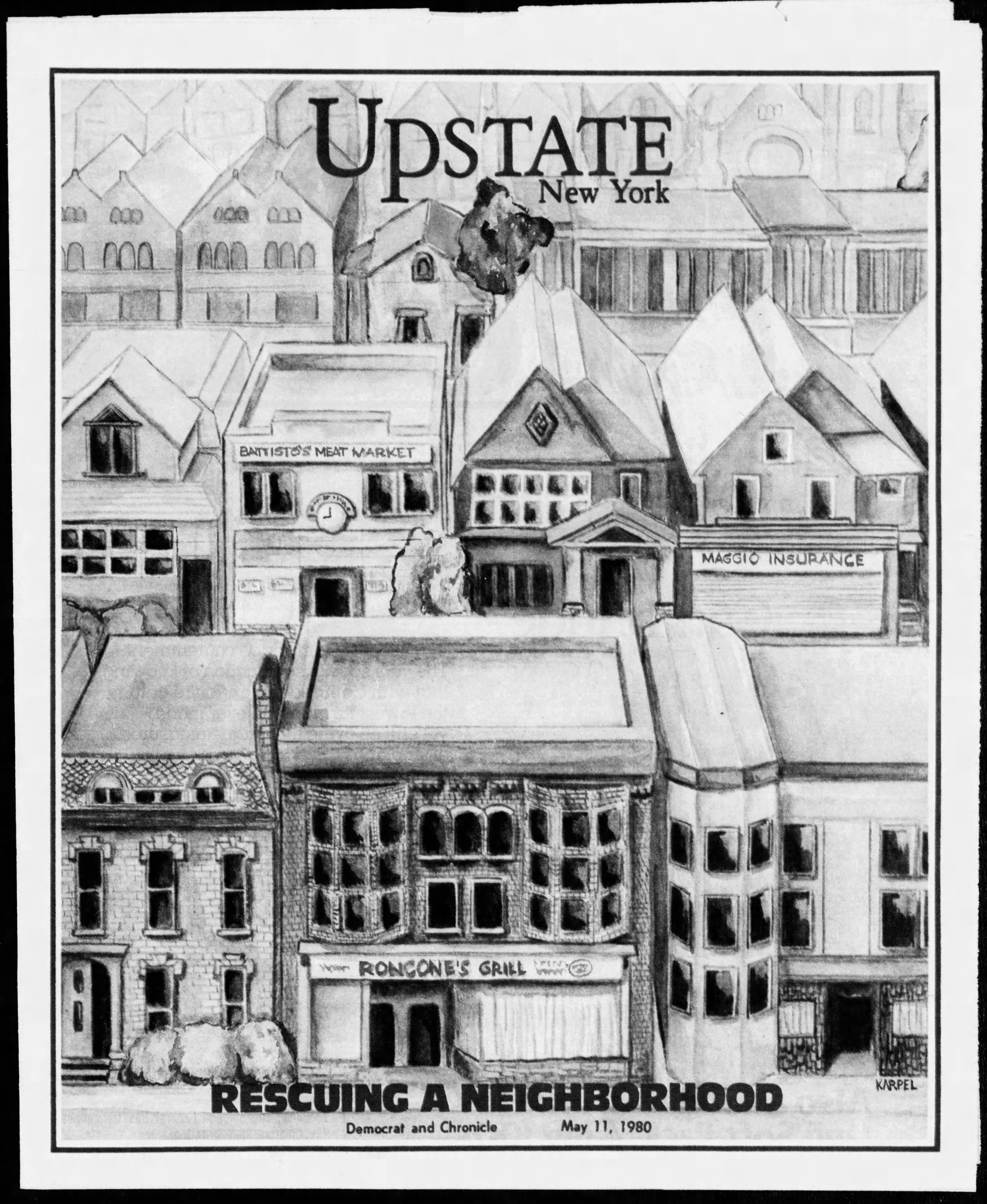
A Rochester magazine promoting the "declining Edgerton" narrative that dominated white-owned local media in the 1980s.

In a prior era, the political infrastructure of the Ninth and Tenth wards may have allowed Edgertonians to push city officials to re-invest in the neighborhood. But in the 1960s and 1970s, Rochester chose to abandon the ward system. The basic political unit in the city changed from a walkable ward neighborhood to a larger district whose inhabitants shared little outside of a busy arterial road. Forced to share political representatives with neighbors from what were radically different wards, such as those that covered the far west side of the city near Gates and the beaches of Lake Ontario. With the rapid loss of political and social identity, the neighborhood association movement of the 1960s was primed to attempt a reconstruction of community in northwest Rochester.

In 1961, a group of neighbors in the Ninth and Tenth wards organized a "community" that they called "Lake Avenue-Edgerton." This, "one of the city's oldest neighborhood groups," was led by a "community council," whose mission was "to meddle into everybody's business insofar as it affects his neighbors and the good of the neighborhood." The council was quickly recognized by the city government and upheld as a model of the voluntary, neighborhood-based alternative to the "bulldoze[r]" approach of government-directed urban renewal.

What became the Edgerton Area Neighborhood Association did its best to mirror the old Republican ward officials in combating the "declining neighborhood" narrative and spurring government investment. In the Association's early days, residents effectively bound together by their old ward identities had real success, obtaining over $11 million (roughly $30 million in 2022 dollars) in local and state investment for better housing and streets. And in the late 1970s, those same neighbors launched a community-driven nonprofit called Neighborhood Housing Services to combat redlining and slumlords by educating homeowners, financing home repairs, enforcing code violations, and opening a tool library.

Soon, however, the cost of losing the ward system became clear. Seeing the successes of revitalization in Edgerton, city politicians largely unaccountable to Edgertonians chose to redirect the resources invested in the neighborhood to "more worthy" locations. Neighborhood Housing Services, an agency Edgertonians believed was theirs, followed the money and moved out. By the end of the decade. local newspapers marked the end of the Edgerton "renaissance," declaring the neighborhood "rundown and unpopular."

Unable to wield power over elected politicians, Edgertonians appealed to officials who responded even to the most disorganized of property owners: police officers. Edgerton leaders, believing their problems could "only be solved by police protection," called to focus their neighborhood association's efforts on the "eradication" of crime in Edgerton. Rather than seeing the "villains" of the neighborhood as the institutions that had abandoned them, Edgertonians came to believe the roots of their problems were unemployed people, the mentally ill, and sex workers. The Edgerton Area Neighborhood Association, lacking the political power to do much more, worked almost exclusively through partnerships with the Rochester Police Department to take a "[c]ivil rights be damned" approach to addressing social problems in Edgerton.

As social disinvestment continued, working class Black and Brown people came to find Edgerton's combination of low rents and parks attractive. Just as white Rochesterians used racial stereotypes to blame Ninth and Tenth Ward crime on lower class Italians, Edgerton's Italian-Americans explicitly blamed the neighborhood's woes on the "disconcerting" phenomenon of "more black families [m]oving onto her street." "We've seen changes of all our foreigners," one resident told a local newspaper. "Colored, Puerto Rican, German – too many of them at one time." Unsurprisingly, the Edgerton Area Neighborhood Association – which once fought against pro-segregation school board candidates – now turned to openly opposing desegregation programs as "threats" to the neighborhood. To justify their change of heart, Edgertonians began embracing revisionist history; they claimed that, when the neighborhood was "tru[ly] Italian," it was "without a whisper of filth and crime."

=== A Colony, Isolated and Invisible (1990–present) ===
Part of what brings these communities down is isolationism. . . .Returning to being neighbors is pretty much what it is all about.

— Karyn Herman, President of the Edgerton Area Neighborhood Association, The Democrat & Chronicle (September 2001)

By the 1990s, most white Edgertonians had left or were too old to do so. Just as their forebears had brought a diverse, international character to Edgerton in the early 1900s, the new Edgertonians did the same. Black and Latino intracity migrants were followed by a wave of Asian immigrants from Bhutan, Myanmar, and Nepal. This migration pattern made Edgerton one of the most racially and ethnically diverse neighborhoods in Western New York. And like the Italian-Americans before them, these new Edgertonians reimbued the neighborhood with vitality through distinct economic and social institutions like Black churches, Asian markets, Dominican hair salons, and soul food restaurants.

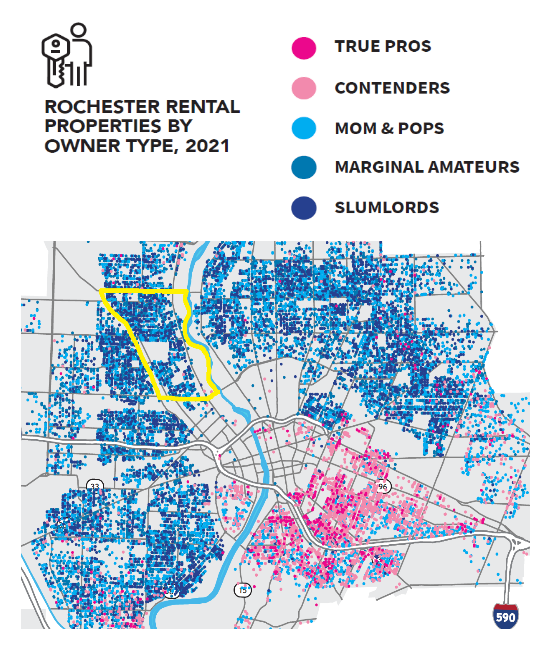
An overwhelming majority of landlords in Edgerton are either slumlords or "amateurs," many of whom live outside of Rochester (or even the United States).

Unlike their predecessors, however, these Edgertonians arrived in a neighborhood isolated from the economic, political, and social institutions that once made Edgerton a neighborhood of community empowerment. Today, Edgerton is served by just two bus lines, a single elementary school and no middle or high school, a mass of scattered, underfunded churches, parks that are empty compared to their heyday, and a business sector populated primarily by corporate restaurants and retail outfits. Most importantly, in place of a powerful ward system that gives the area social and political cohesiveness, there is a city government that has no Edgertonian as an elected official. Edgerton's neighborhood association, unlike those of most Rochester neighborhoods, lacks enough structure to maintain a website; it continues to focus on police-based neighborhood revitalization.

The strongest institution in modern day Edgerton is not city government, religious institutions, or community organizations. Instead, it is a network of landlords who dominate a local property base that is almost exclusively residential. A 2021 study revealed that the overwhelming majority of these landlords were either slumlords or "amateurs" who "barely maintain and do not invest in their properties." The same study found that half of all rental properties in neighborhoods like Edgerton had one or more outstanding code violations, suggesting that landlords inflict extensive property degradation on the neighborhood. A 2018 study found that the majority of homes in Edgerton were purchased with cash, indicating a low rate of occupant-owned properties. In a representative subsection of the neighborhood east of Edgerton Park, at least 85% of housing units were owned by individuals or companies from outside of Rochester. Many rental properties in Edgerton are owned by out-of-state landlords, including property management companies located in places like Canada and Mexico. Residents, who call themselves "victim[s] of redlining," struggle to obtain homeowner's insurance because they are deemed to live in an "at risk" neighborhood.

Few of the facts about Edgerton's remarkable diversity, unique socio-political groundwork, or the roots of its problems are reported on by Rochester's local media system. If Rochesterians hear about Edgerton, it is typically through a story about a shooting, home invasion, or other crimes occurring in the neighborhood. What "positive" stories exist either focus on combatting neighborhood violence, reminiscing about the neighborhood's past, or are written by one of Rochester's few Black-owned media outlets. This silence is echoed by Rochester's government, which rarely mentions Edgerton or targets its streets for the innovative social programs that often are generated by local politicians.

A colony is, by definition, a territory subject to a form of foreign rule. In Edgerton, extractive, out-of-state landlords, corporate business establishments, and unaccountable, non-native politicians govern the neighborhood. Like many other colonies that have defined the Americas, the governing institutions are predominantly white, while the resident population is predominantly Black and Brown. But unlike many of these colonies, which were recognized as such during their existences, Edgerton is not. Indeed, Edgerton is, as one resident put it, so invisible it is called, "The Bermuda Triangle of Rochester."

== People ==
=== Demographics ===
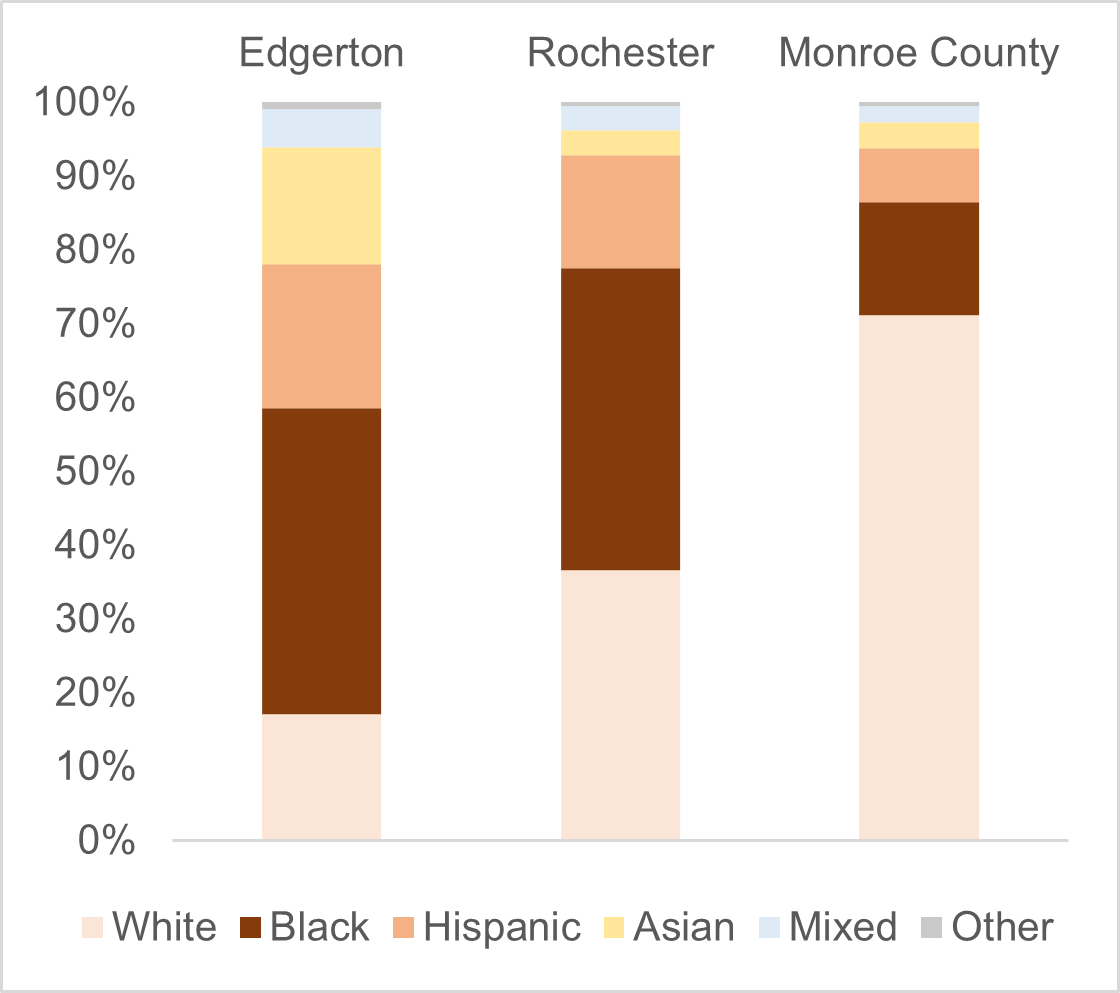
Edgerton's diversity compared to that of surrounding communities.

Edgerton's 3,000 homes contain just over 7,500 residents, with most living in the areas surrounding Edgerton Park. Its even mix of Black, Latino, Asian, and white populations make it one of the most racially and ethnically diverse neighborhoods in Western New York. White residents tend to live in the north of Edgerton Park and Asian residents in the southern area between Edgerton Park and Jones Square Park area, while Black residents are spread evenly across the neighborhood.

Roughly one in four Edgertonians were born outside of the United States, making it the second-most diverse Rochester neighborhood in terms of national origin. Nearly all of Edgerton's immigrants are from Asia, with a small percentage hailing from the Americas and Europe. The neighborhood has a high concentration of Bhutanese, Burmese, Nepalese, Sub-Saharan African, Pakistani, and Armenian populations. While Edgerton was once a center of Italian immigrants, it now has one of the smallest percentage of residents claiming Italian ancestry among Rochester's neighborhoods.

Edgerton is the poorest neighborhood in Rochester, with median household income of $17,200; 98% of households have annual incomes of less than $25,000. Nearly two-thirds of all Edgertonians receive SNAP benefits. Edgerton has one of the lowest educational attainment rates in Rochester, with roughly 25% resident never having graduated from high school and less than 20% having a bachelor's degree or more. Just half of Edgertonians are in the workforce; of those, roughly 25% are unemployed, with the rest working in the healthcare, manufacturing, retail, hospitality, and education sectors. Few, if any, Edgertonians work in management positions, as police officers, or as engineers.

=== Notable residents ===
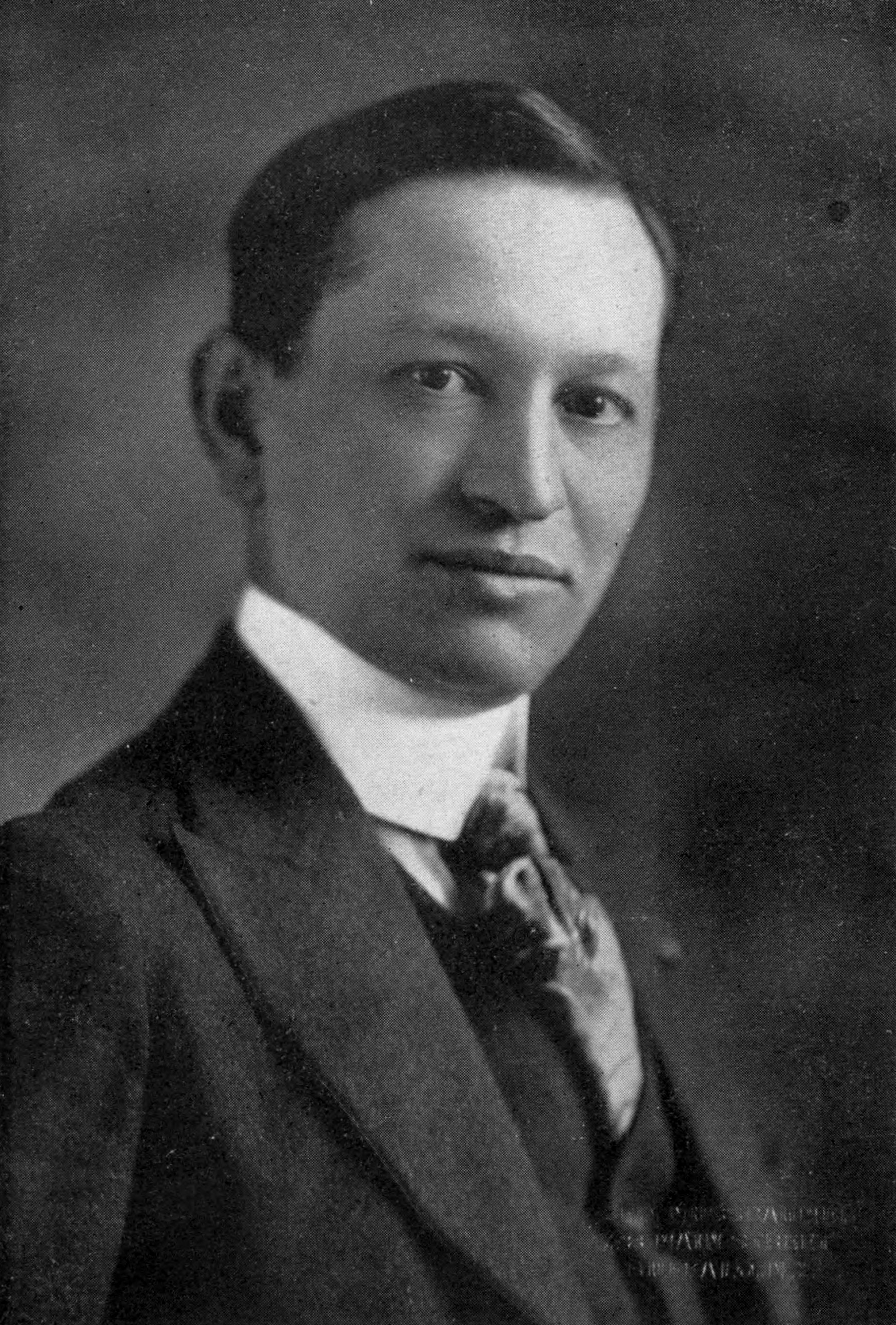
Edgertonian Arthur Caswell Parker, a member of the Onödowáʼga tribe, focused the Rochester Museum & Science Center's work on discovering and uplifting the history of indigenous peoples.

During the late 19th century, Edgerton drew a host of industrial innovators and scientists to its streets. Kodak founder George Eastman spent his 20s and 30s – his most inventive period – living on Ambrose Street and Jones Avenue; there, he would begin to experiment with photography in his mother's kitchen, invent the first commercially successful flexible film, and begin to sell the first camera designed for film – which he called a "Kodak camera." Eastman's most prominent funder, Henry A. Strong, lived just down the street. Eastman's then-landlord, E.F. Woodbury, was another neighbor and funder; his stock in Kodak would be passed to his granddaughter, Edgertonian Margaret Woodbury Strong, a "notorious eccentric" who used her Kodak wealth to purchase the toy collection that served as the foundation for the Strong National Museum of Play. Other notable Edgertonian innovators during this time included: Jeremiah Hickey, founder of Hickey Freeman clothiers; Thomas Dransfield, founder of what would become Bausch & Lomb; and Lewis Swift, the most famous astronomer of his time, who used to lay down in the middle of Ambrose Street to view the stars.

During its time as the center of Rochester's "Good Government" movement, Edgerton was home to the core group of so-called "Goo Goos," along with other social reformers. This group included Helen Barrett Montgomery, called the "best known of daughters of Rochester," who was a radical feminist, friend of Susan B. Anthony, the first woman to serve on the Rochester School Board, the first woman to ever lead a major religious denomination, and the founder of the Woman's Educational and Industrial Union. It also included progressive preacher Clarence Augustus Barbour, pacifist teetotaler Clinton Norman Howard, jurist John Franklin Kinney, and Arthur Caswell Parker, the first leader of the Rochester Museum & Science Center, served as the inaugural president of the Society for American Archaeology, and directed the Works Progress Administration-funded Indian Arts Project. Other notable Edgertonian government officials include Ronald Evangelista, an Italian-American Edgertonian who became one of the most controversial and powerful figures in Rochester as head of the local police union; Evangelista openly supported the "suspension of basic constitutional rights, police brutality, and . . . physical intimidation" during his three-decade tenure.

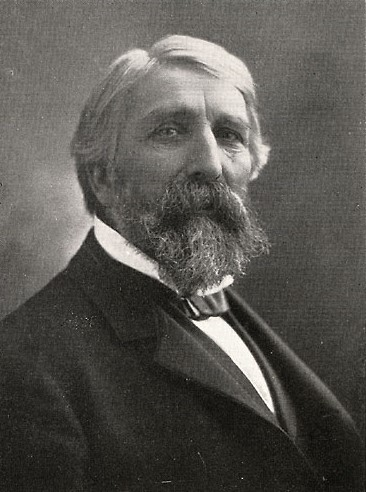
Edgertonian John Van Voorhis was a congressman and attorney who represented Susan B. Anthony in U.S. v. Anthony and the Onödowáʼga in their battles against land grabbers.

=== Representatives ===
Historically, Edgerton has been a ladder for residents looking to represent the neighborhood and Rochester at the state and federal level. Edgertonians who have served in the United States House of Representatives include Charles S. Baker, John Van Voorhis, and Lewis Selye. Currently, none of the neighborhood's elected representatives live in Edgerton.

At the local level, Edgerton is part of the Northwest Council District, currently represented by Charlotte resident and Democrat Jose Peo, who is most famous for controversial rhetoric that has been called "incendiary," "racist," "lewd," and "misogynist." Edgerton is represented in the New York State Senate by Center City resident and Democrat Jeremy Cooney and in the New York State Assembly by 19th Ward resident and Democrat Demond Meeks. At the federal level, Edgertonians are represented by Joe Morelle, a Democrat who lives in the Rochester suburb of Irondequoit.

== Geography ==
Edgerton is dominated by three geographical features: large, highly landscaped parks that serve as "village squares"; streets filled with "Victorian houses with intricate woodwork, cupolas, square towers and unusual windows"; and landmarks like the Genesee River, which serves as the neighborhood's eastern border.

=== Parks ===
Edgerton is home to over 50 acres of parkland spread across four distinct parks. The first, Edgerton Park, is called the "heart of the neighborhood" due to its central location and over 40 acres of amenities, including basketball courts, bocce courts, tennis courts, a football field, a soccer field, baseball diamonds, a running track, walking trails, and a spray park. Jones Square Park is an eight-acre plot of land landscaped by Frederick Law Olmsted's firm that consists of a central fountain and period-style seating area from which a network of pathways expands outwards to an outer oval pathway. Lower Falls Park, listed on the National Register of Historic Places, is a 10-acre meadow that "offers spectacular and close-up views of the Lower and Middle Falls" of the Genesee River. Finally, there is Tacoma Park, a 1.3-acre area known for its playground that is nestled in the northwest corner of the neighborhood.

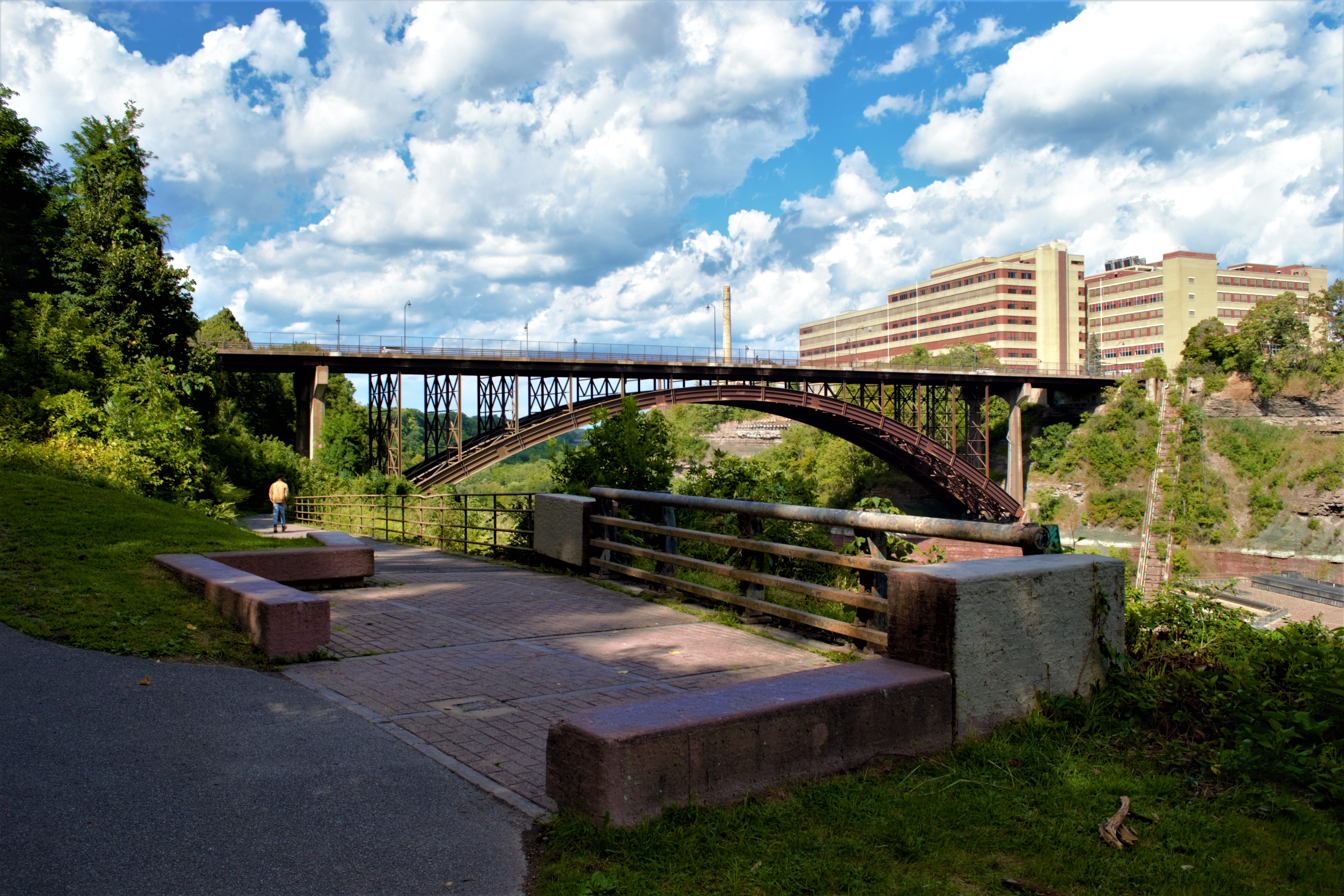
A view from Lower Falls Park depicting the Driving Park Bridge and a portion of the 24-mile Genesee Riverway Trail.

In addition to these public parks, Edgerton is also home to two newer, semi-public parks. In the early 2000s, a group of volunteers transformed the trash-filled lot next to the Dewey Avenue post office into the Garden of Peace & Life, which features a mural titled "In the Garden" that depicts landmarks in Edgerton and neighboring Maplewood. The Gateway, a pocket park located at the corner of Dewey and Ravine Avenues in the northwest section of the neighborhood, is a once-vacant lot filled with trees, shrubs, perennials, boulder seats, and a lending library kiosk; established in 2013, government officials abandoned plans to take formal stewardship of the park, which now sits unmaintained. Other notable non-park green spaces include a two-acre meadow on Kay Terrace and the Old Erie Canal Bed, a seven-acre field that runs along the western edge of the neighborhood.

=== Transportation ===
Edgerton was once a major stop on the various public transit systems serving Rochester. In the 1880s, horse-drawn buses ran through the neighborhood's southern end; by the early 1900s, trolleys were running north-south and east-west throughout the neighborhood. In 1928, the city unveiled the Edgerton Park station on Felix Street near Dewey Avenue, which allowed visitors to ride the Rochester subway to access the annual Rochester Exposition and Horse Show held at Edgerton Park. Since the closure of the subway system in the mid-1950s, the sole form of public transit in Edgerton has been bus lines operated by the Regional Transit Service. Edgerton is currently serviced by just two bus routes, supplemented by station-to-door van service in the western part of the neighborhood.

Today, the primary mode of transportation in Edgerton is privately owned passenger vehicles, which primarily traverse the four collector roads that bound the neighborhood. The street in the north, Driving Park Avenue, is named after "the most famous racetrack in the world" that once bordered the street. The western street, Dewey Avenue, is named after Battle of Manila Bay victor George Dewey. The southern street, Lyell Avenue, is named after the local highway commissioner who developed the street, Philip Lyell. The eastern street, Lake Avenue, is named for its role in connecting downtown Rochester to Lake Ontario. Of these four streets, Lake Avenue is the busiest road, seeing an average of roughly one car every three seconds on its north-south street. Local roads like Fulton Avenue, Locust Street, and Parkway serve to connect residential blocks to the main thoroughfares.

=== Landmarks ===
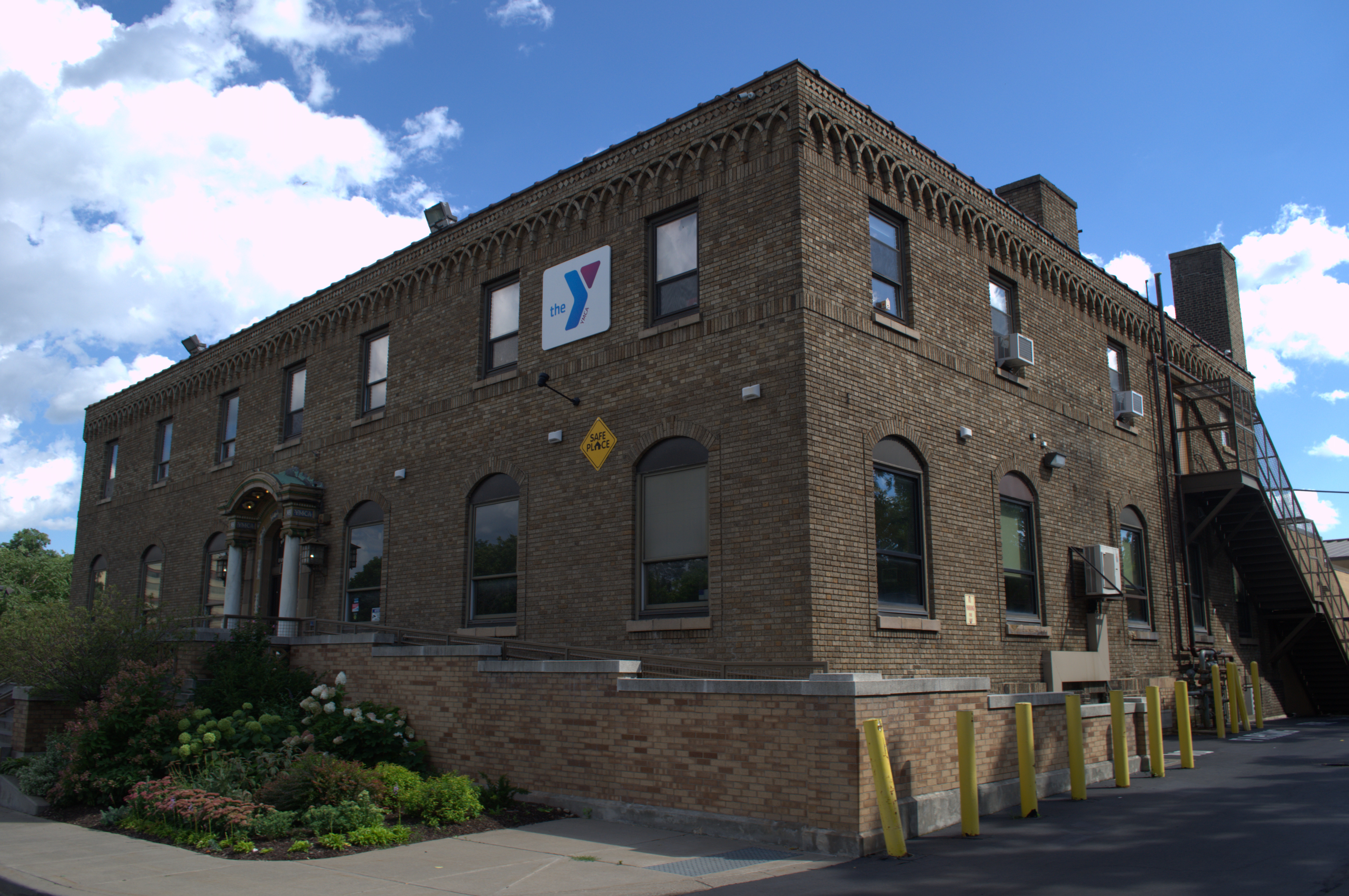
George Eastman paid Claude Bragdon $250,000 to build the Maplewood Branch YMCA in 1916.

Edgerton's landscape contains a significant amount of notable architecture, most of which was built in the 1900s. The Holy Rosary Church Complex, built in the Spanish eclectic style, is listed on the National Register of Historic Places and currently contains an affordable housing complex and Mary's Place Refugee Outreach. After a fire consumed its century-old chapel in the 1970s, Lake Avenue Memorial Baptist Church was reconstructed as a precast concrete Modernist building to capture the "changing role of urban churches"; today, the congregation describes itself as an open and affirming, anti-racist, multiracial congregation that has a special focus on serving Edgerton's Burmese population. The Maplewood Branch YMCA, built to be "the best little 'Y' branch in the world" by famed architect Claude Bragdon, is one of the last two YMCA locations located within the city of Rochester. The neighborhood's largest building is Thomas Jefferson High School building, which occupies two-and-a-half acres and contains a transitional education school for immigrants and refugees. Edgerton's tallest building, the fourteen-story Lake Tower, is Rochester's second-largest public housing complex, featuring a community room, a lending library, and a powerful tenant association.

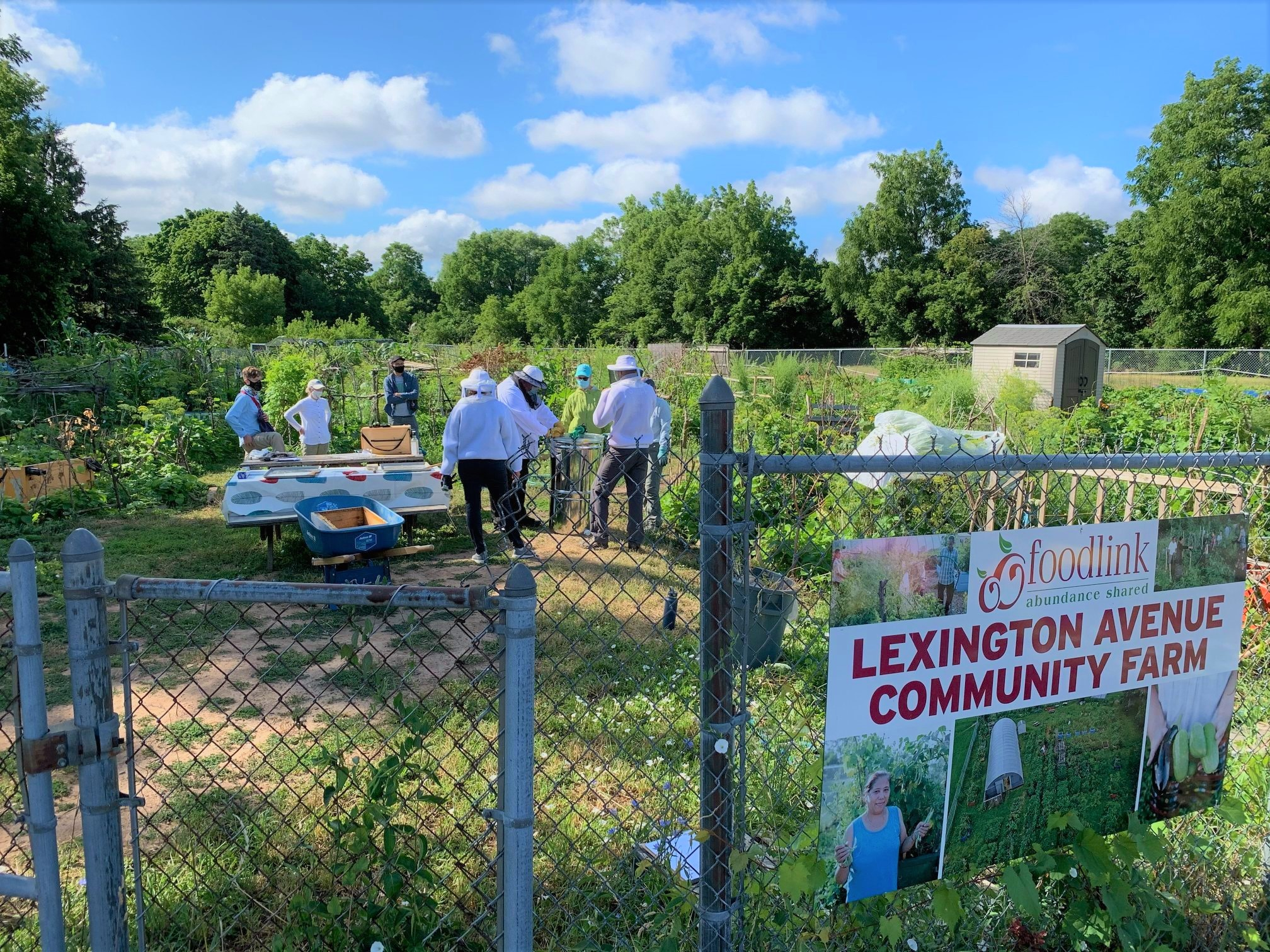
Volunteers at the Lexington Avenue Urban Farm harvest honey from the farm's beehives.

Unlike almost all other Rochester neighborhoods, Edgerton is home to a significant amount of agricultural land, which includes the Lexington Avenue Urban Farm. Located at the northeastern tip of the neighborhood, this two-acre section of the Old Erie Canal Bed was purchased by Foodlink, Rochester's regional food bank, in the early 2010s to create what is now the largest urban farm in Western New York. In partnership with neighborhood nonprofit Mary's Place Refugee Outreach, plots on the farm were given to dozens of local Burmese and Nepali families, each of which has a key to the gated farm. Thanks to these families and local volunteers, the farm produces over 8,000 pounds of food each year and now contains a large community garden, a hoop house, a commercial growing operation, beehives, a toy library, and a play area. In addition to the Lexington Avenue farm, Edgerton is home to Benji's Garden, a small community garden at the Charles Street Settlement House, and the George Herring Memorial Garden, a which allows residents in the northeast side of the neighborhood to grow crops in memory of a child killed on Kay Terrace.

== Institutions ==
Edgerton's institutional landscape is both weak and rich. It is weak in that local, state, and federal governments, along with key businesses like Wegmans and wealthy nonprofits like the Catholic Church, have largely abandoned Edgerton. The landscape is rich in that, despite this systemic disinvestment in their neighborhood, Edgertonians have built and sustained a diverse network of locally owned and directed organizations, including healthcare institutions, Black-owned businesses, and temples for Christians, Hindus, and Muslims.

=== Governmental ===
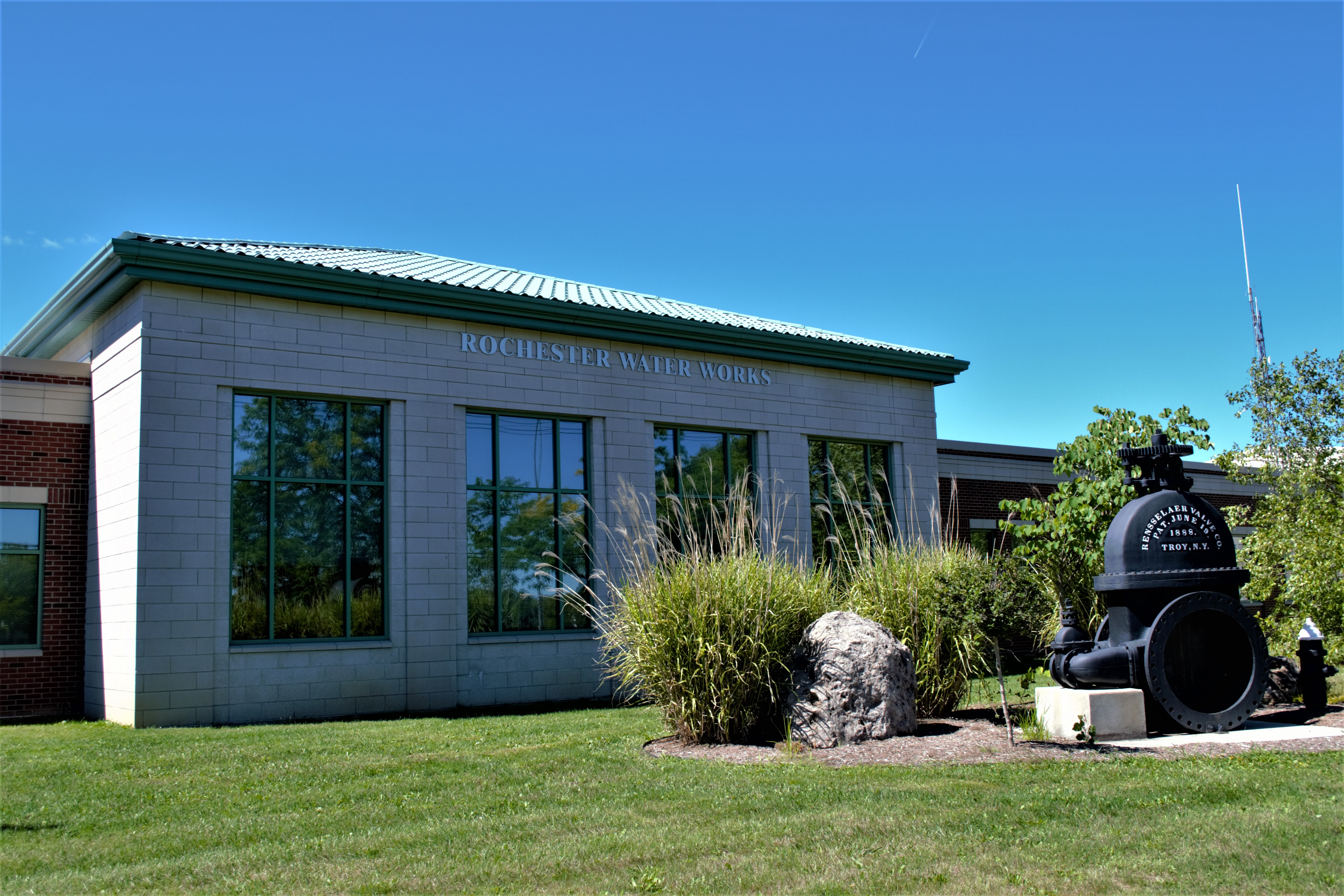
In front of the Water Bureau headquarters is a five-ton stop valve once used in Rochester's water system.

The primary governmental unit in Edgerton is the Northwest Quadrant Neighborhood Service Center, which is located in the heart of the neighborhood at Edgerton Park. Empowered to act as "mini City Halls" by providing code enforcement and policing services, the service centers have been criticized by consultants and members of the public as being unaccountable and ineffective. Across the street from the service center is the administrative headquarters for the City of Rochester's Water Bureau, which has maintained a presence on Felix Street for over 90 years; in the late 2000s, the Water Bureau literally ground up its old facilities and used the recycled materials to create "the first municipal building in Rochester recognized for outstanding design by the U.S. Green Building Council." The neighborhood also contains the Dewey Avenue post office, which features the Garden of Peace & Life.

The most widely used government facility in Edgerton is City of Rochester's Edgerton Recreation Center (or "R-Center"), which is also located in Edgerton Park. The R-Center's interior features include a community meeting space, computer lab, weight room, game room, and kitchen. The R-Center is home to the Edgerton Model Railroad Room, which shows Rochester as it existed in all four seasons of the year 1950 and has been called "the largest and most unique model railroad display in the world." The R-Center also contains the Stardust Ballroom, the former Western House of Refuge auditorium that now serves as a rentable performance facility that can fit up to 400 people in theater-style seating.

=== Nonprofit ===
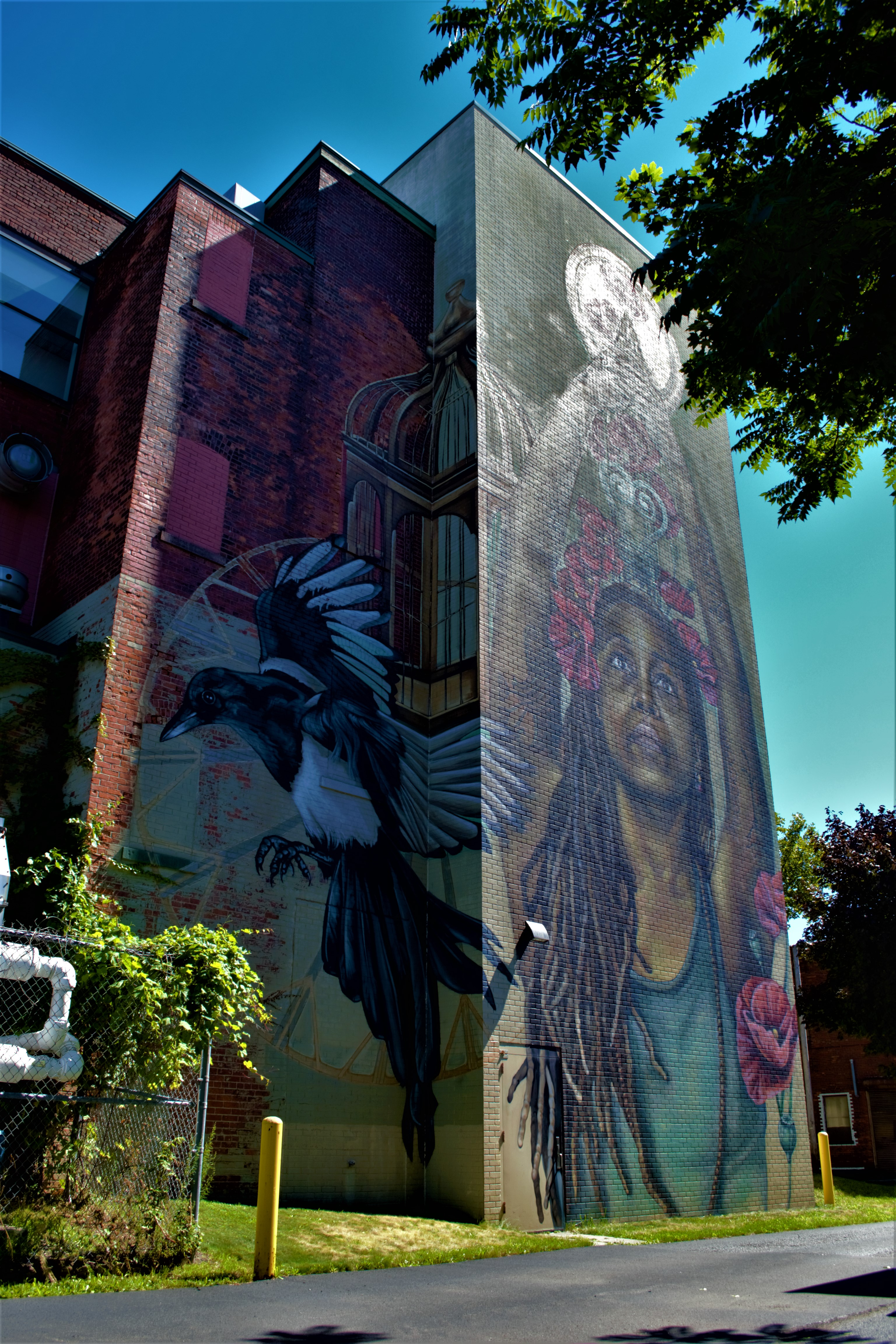
The mural on the back of the Charles Settlement House rises over Dewey and Lyell Avenues in the south of Edgerton.

Many of the services traditionally provided by government agencies are, in Edgerton, delivered through a network of local nonprofits such as the Charles Settlement House, a settlement movement institution founded in 1917 by the Barry family to integrate the neighborhood's Italian and German immigrants. Today, the House coordinates with a range of local agencies to provide free food along with workforce development, after-school, and senior-support programs. Mary's Place Refugee Outreach provides similar services targeted to the local refugee population, while NCS Community Development Corporation helps to build, rehabilitate, and manage affordable housing in Edgerton and other Northwest Quadrant neighborhoods. The neighborhood also contains the Volunteers of America of Upstate New York, the New York regional office of the National Center for Missing & Exploited Children, Edgerton Square, an independent living center for people with mental illness, and the Union Hall for United Auto Workers Local 1097, which represents workers at the nearby General Motors components plant.

Edgerton has a high concentration of religious institutions, including the above-mentioned Lake Avenue Memorial Baptist Church. Adonai Assembly of God, housed in an Episcopal church built in 1881, defines itself as a multi-cultural church that focuses on providing outreach ministries in Edgerton. Greater Harvest Church, located in a Methodist church built in 1907, is one of the largest predominantly Black churches in the Northwest Quadrant. Another notable congregation is the Pentecostal Ark of the Covenant Church of God by Faith, which is housed in the old St. Anthony of Padua Catholic Church building. Newer religious nonprofits include the Bantu Islamic Center at the corner of Dewey Avenue and Locust Street and the Hindu temple Gaudiya Mission on Fulton Avenue.

=== Educational ===
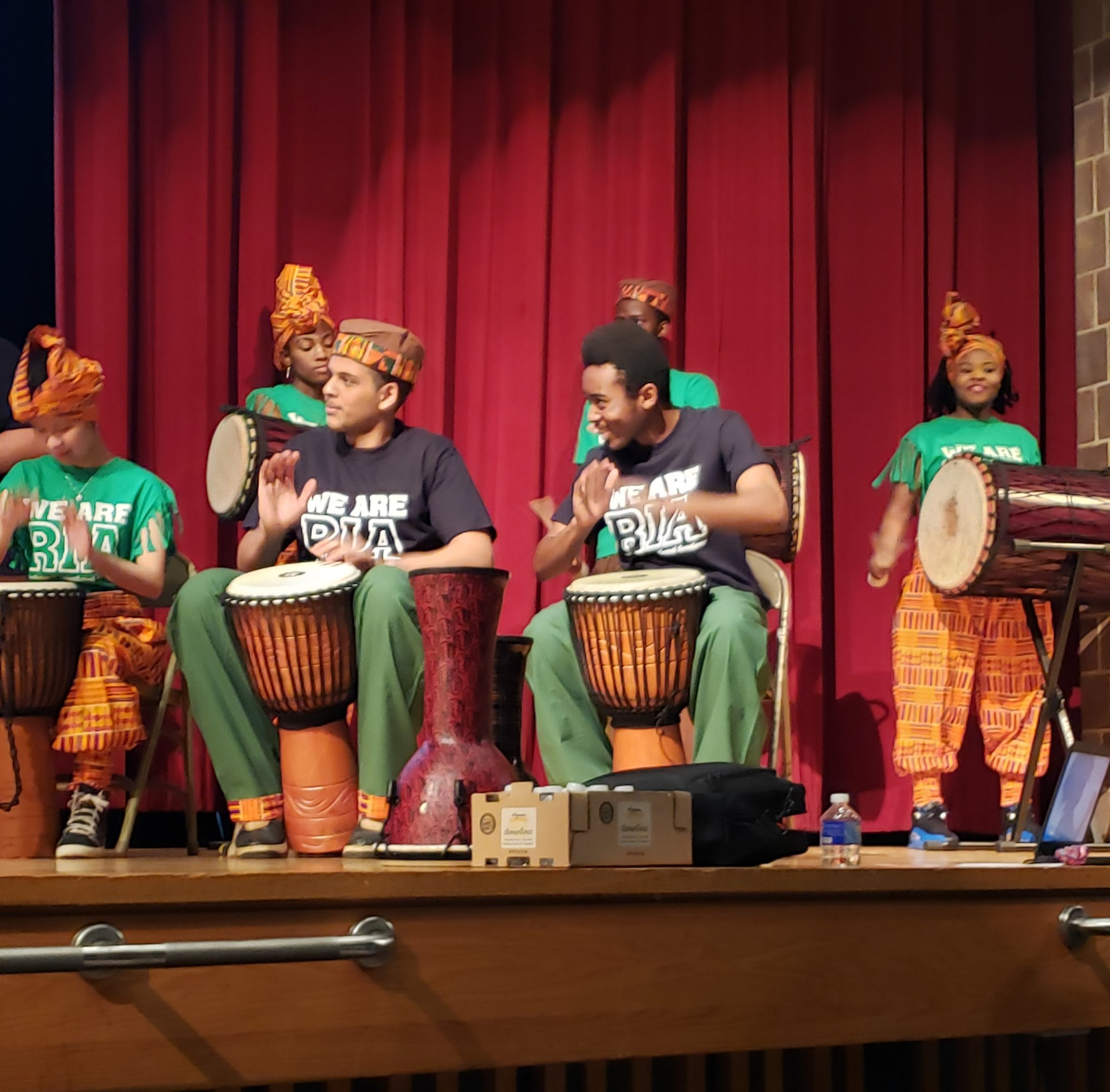
Members of the Rochester International Academy's "World Drummers" ensemble perform at a 2020 event

Children in Edgerton typically attend pre-kindergarten at the Volunteers of America Children's Center on Lake Avenue, which is the largest neighborhood pre-K provider in the city. Edgertonians attend elementary school in the northern part of the neighborhood, at Dr. Louis A. Cerulli School No. 34. Named in 1974 after a school board president who was the "leader of the opposition to desegregation" in the 1960s, the school now serves a population that is 90% Black and Brown. Edgertonians have not been able to attend a neighborhood-based high school since the early 2010', when the Rochester City School District closed Thomas Jefferson High School.

A number of notable non-traditional public school facilities are located in Edgerton. The most notable is the Rochester International Academy, housed in the closed Thomas Jefferson school, which provides immigrants and refugees of all ages with the social and linguistic support they need to transfer to a traditional school environment. In the mid-2010s, the National Education Policy Center named the Academy a Gold School of Opportunity, thanks to its ability to close opportunity gaps through research-based practices. The city school district also runs its special education programs out of the old Saint Anthony's School, a Catholic school that opened in the early 1900s to serve the children of Italian immigrants.

=== Healthcare ===
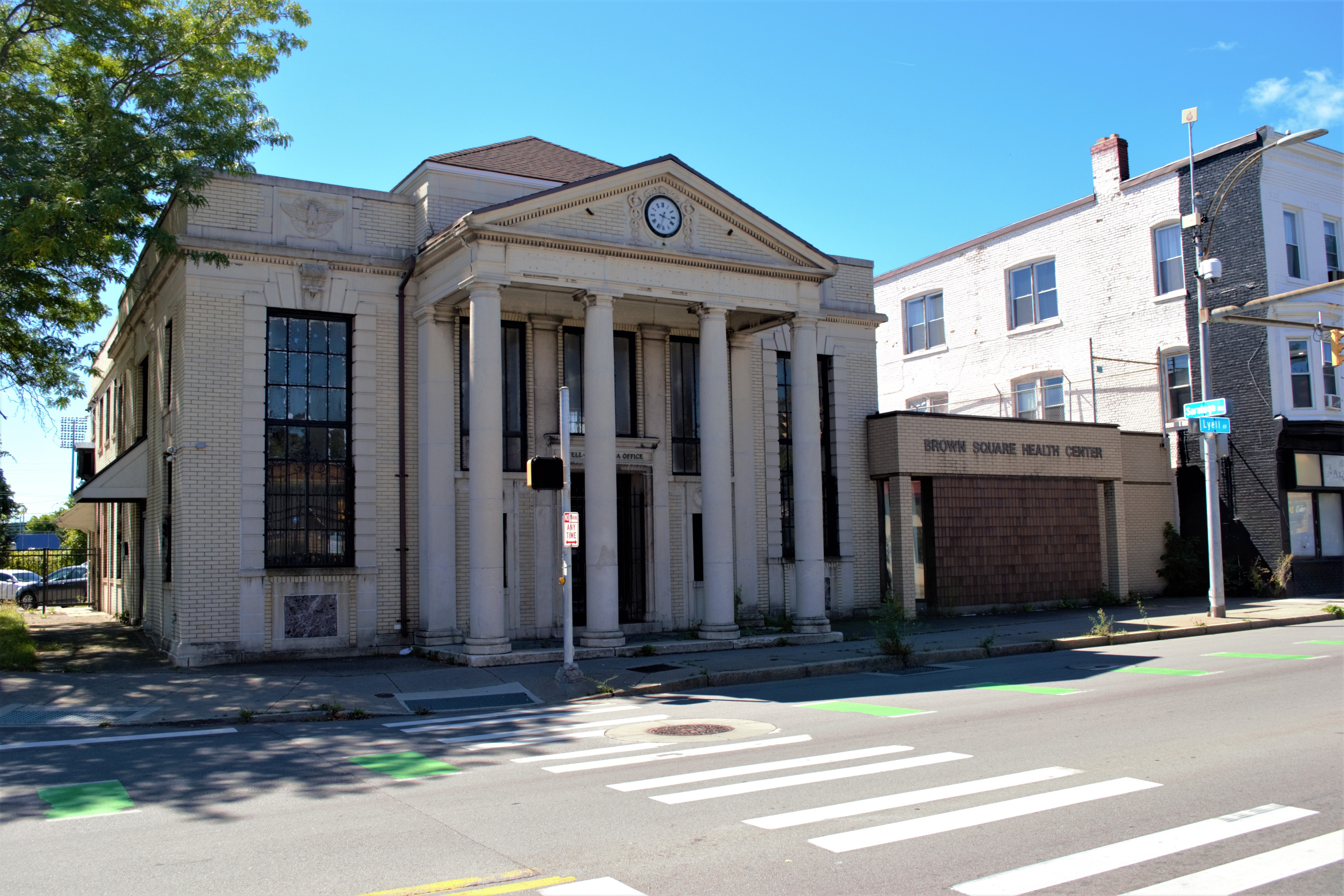
Brown Square Health Center was originally located in the Edgerton branch of the Union Trust Company.

Edgerton is home to the Brown Square Health Center, which opened in 1972 as part of what was called a "semi-socialist experiment" funded by the federal Office of Economic Opportunity. The Center's charter goal was to give healthcare to "the city's richest cultural mix of white, black and Spanish-speaking peoples and a mix of some of the city's lowest and most median incomes." Doctors would "provide medical attention for people who need it, whether they can pay the bills or not," while an advisory board of patients who would "partly run" the Center's programs. In 2011, after a period of financial struggles brought on by inadequate reimbursement formulas under Medicaid, the Center was taken over by Jordan Health, a fellow Federally Qualified Health Center. Today, the Center primarily serves clients on Medicaid or those who have no insurance, and is a hub for immigrant populations seeking culturally responsive healthcare.

Edgerton also contains Saratoga Pharmacy, one of Rochester's only independent pharmacies. Saratoga, which calls itself a "community pharmacy," provides a range of free services to its primarily low-income clientele, such as medication delivery and disposal, health screenings, and care coordination. Saratoga uses a combination of multilingual medication packaging and bilingual employees to provide proper services to Edgerton's linguistically diverse community. The pharmacy, founded in the 1920s, currently serves as Rochester's only minority-owned pharmacy.

== Galleries ==
=== Landscapes ===
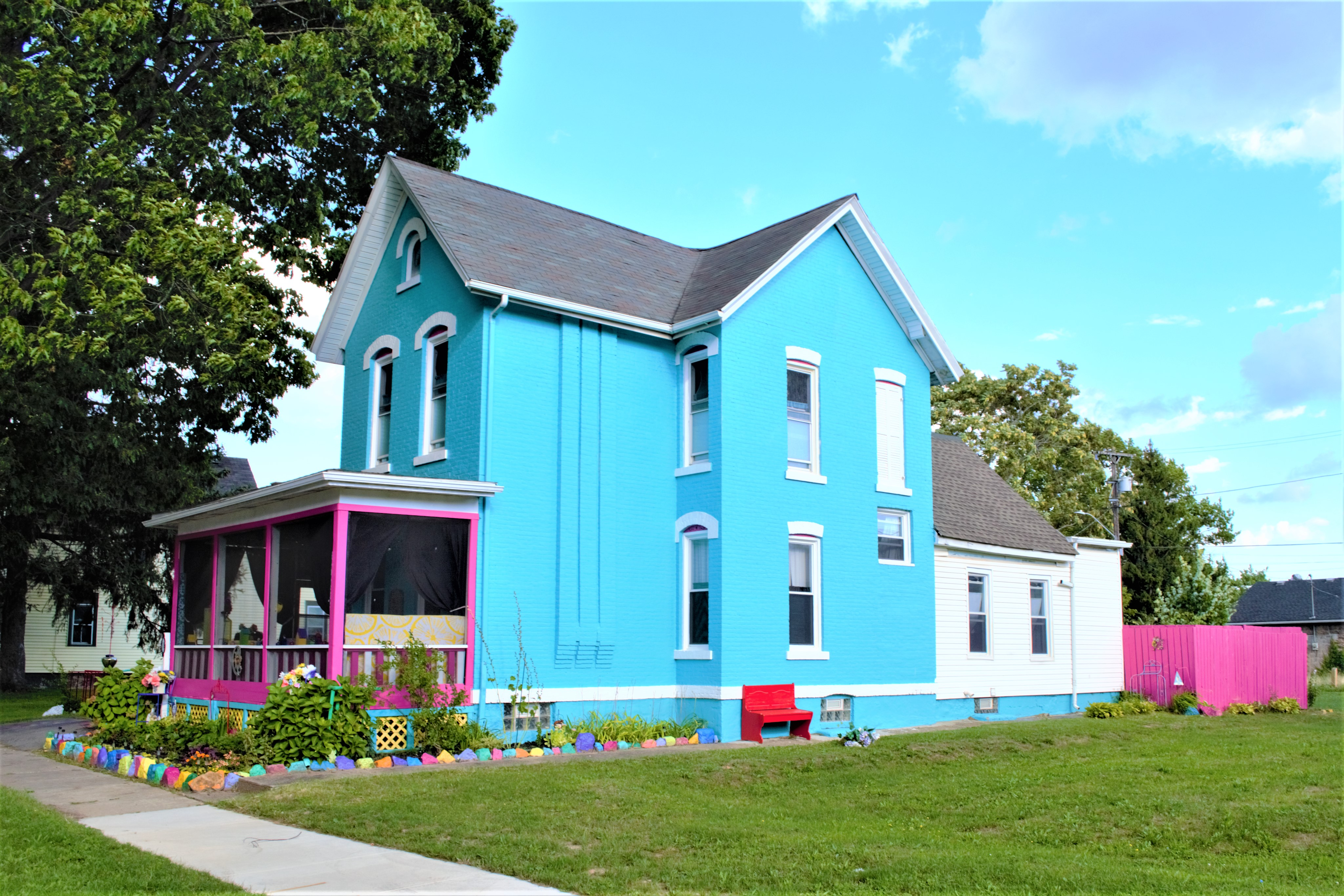
The house at 119 Ambrose Street is of Edgerton's many polychrome Victorian homes.

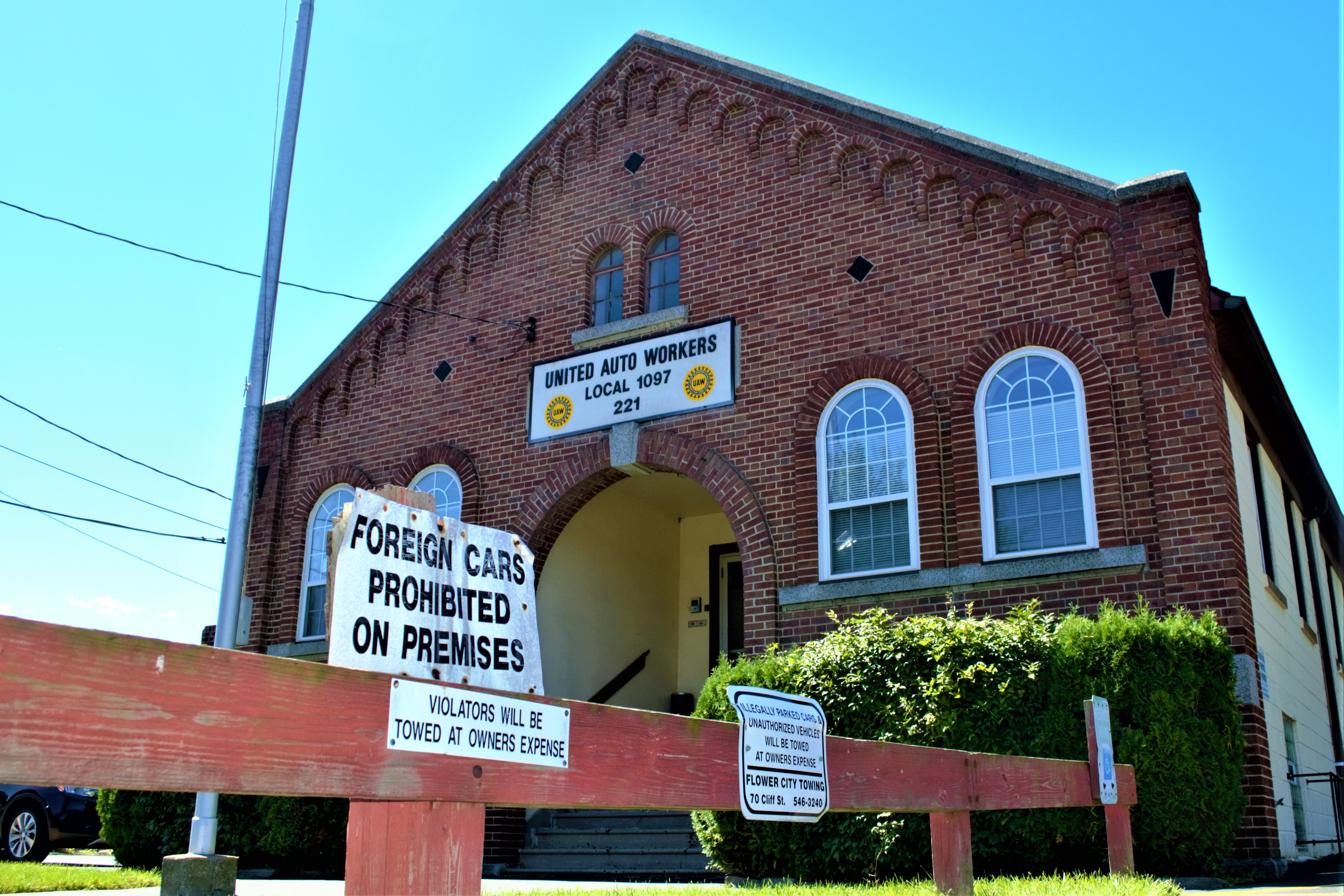
UAW Local 1097's union hall, with its famous foreign car towing policy.

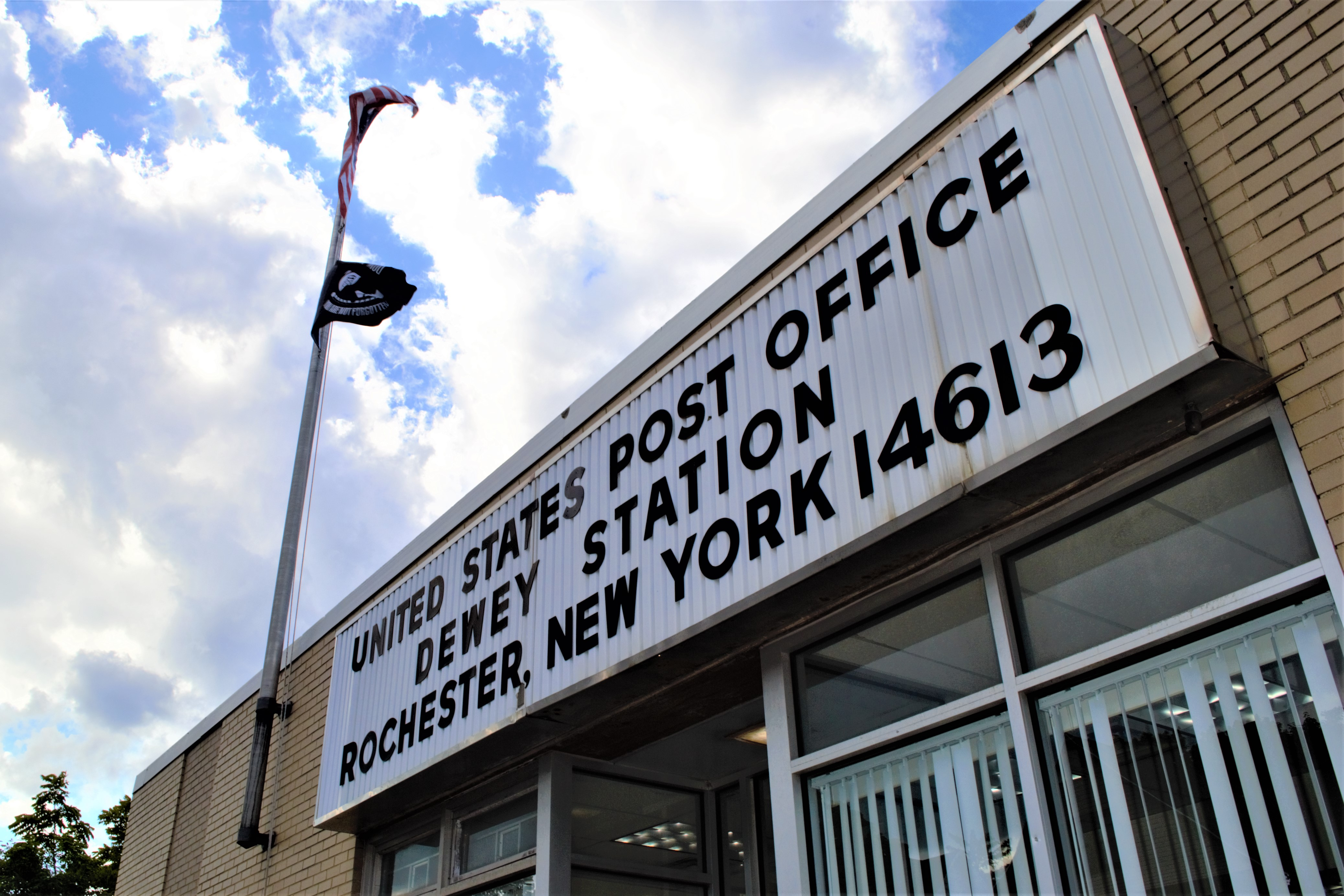
Dewey Station, the single U.S. Postal Service location in Edgerton.

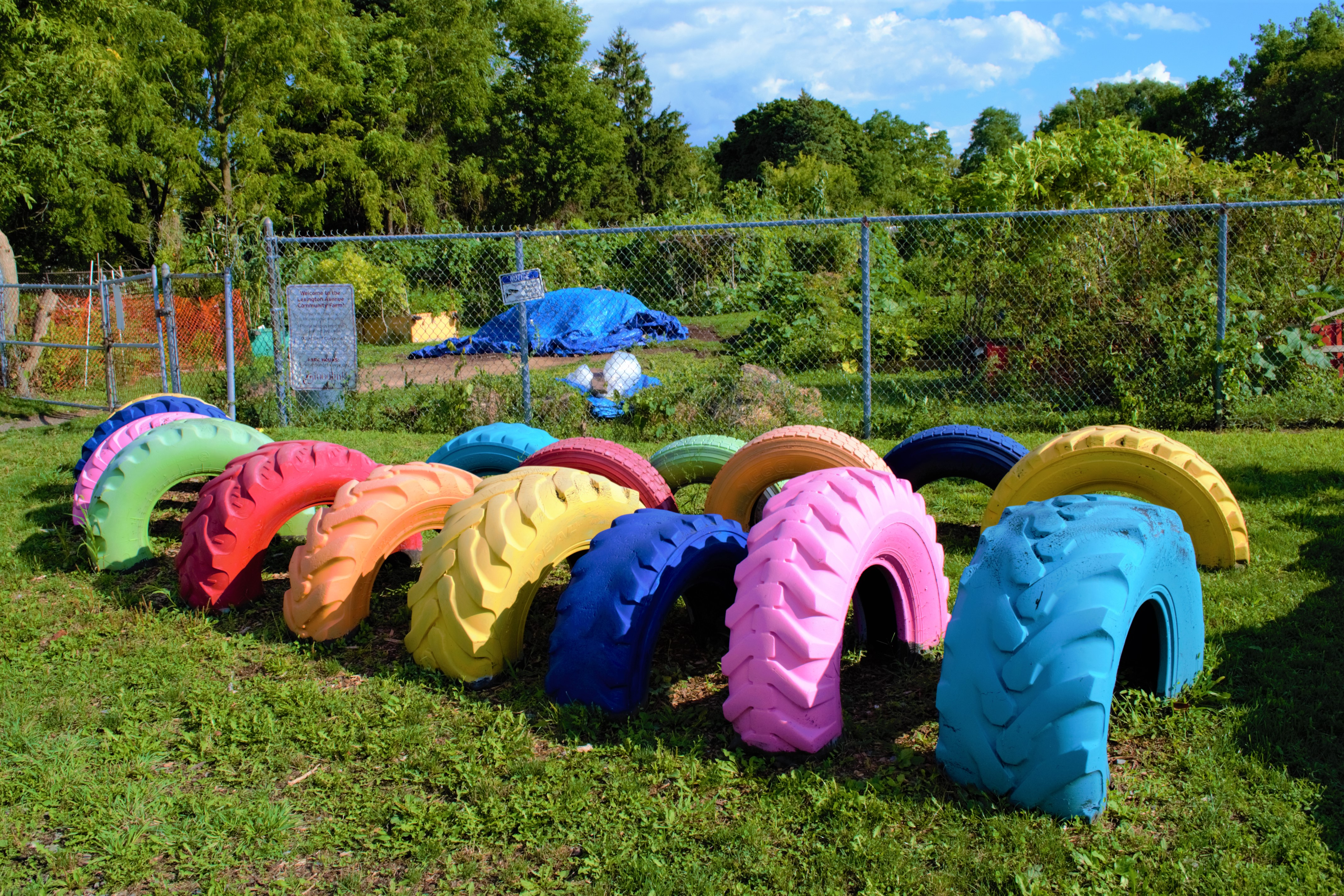
The playground at Lexington Avenue Urban Farm.

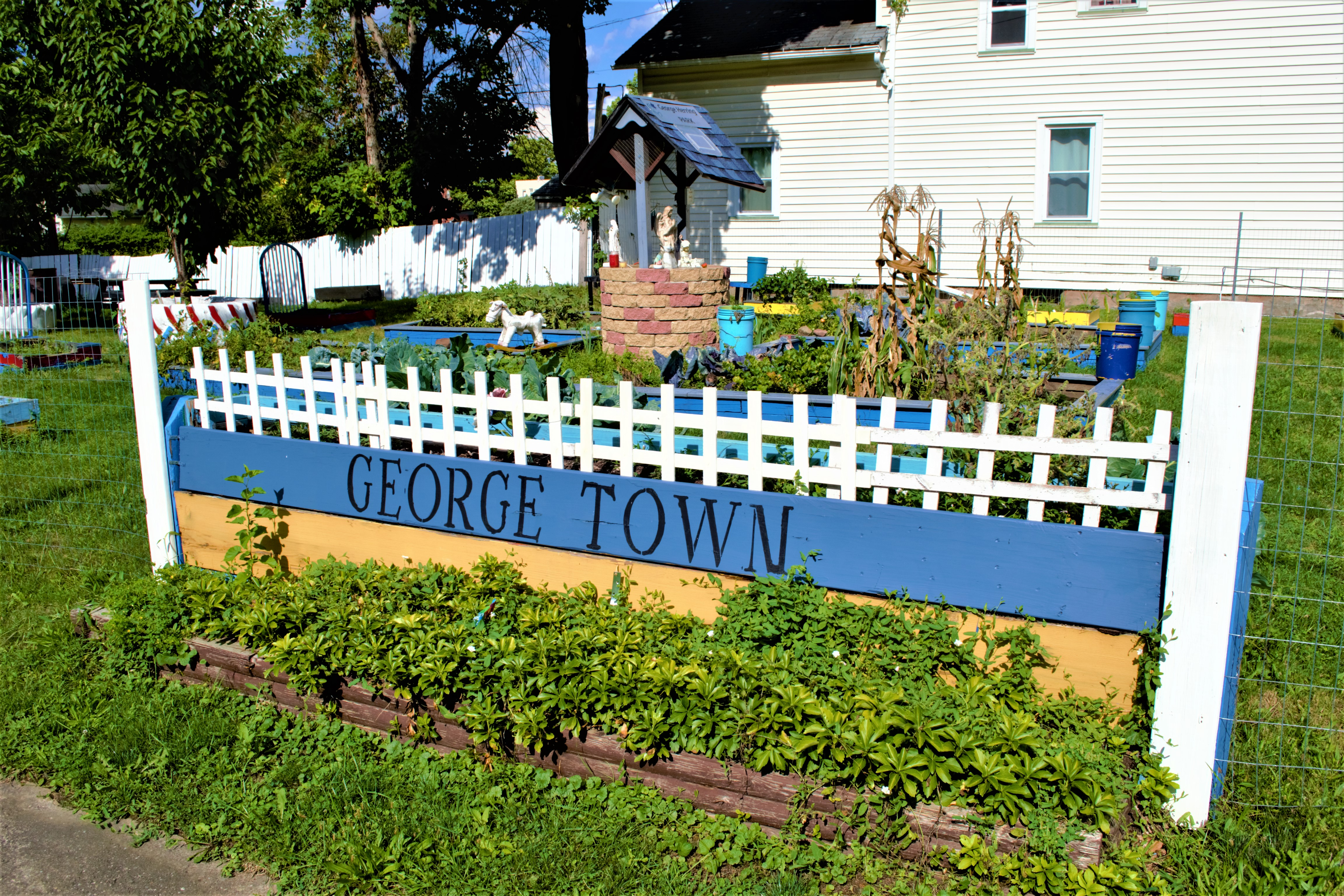
The George Herring Memorial Garden, named after a 17-year-old killed on Kay Terrace.

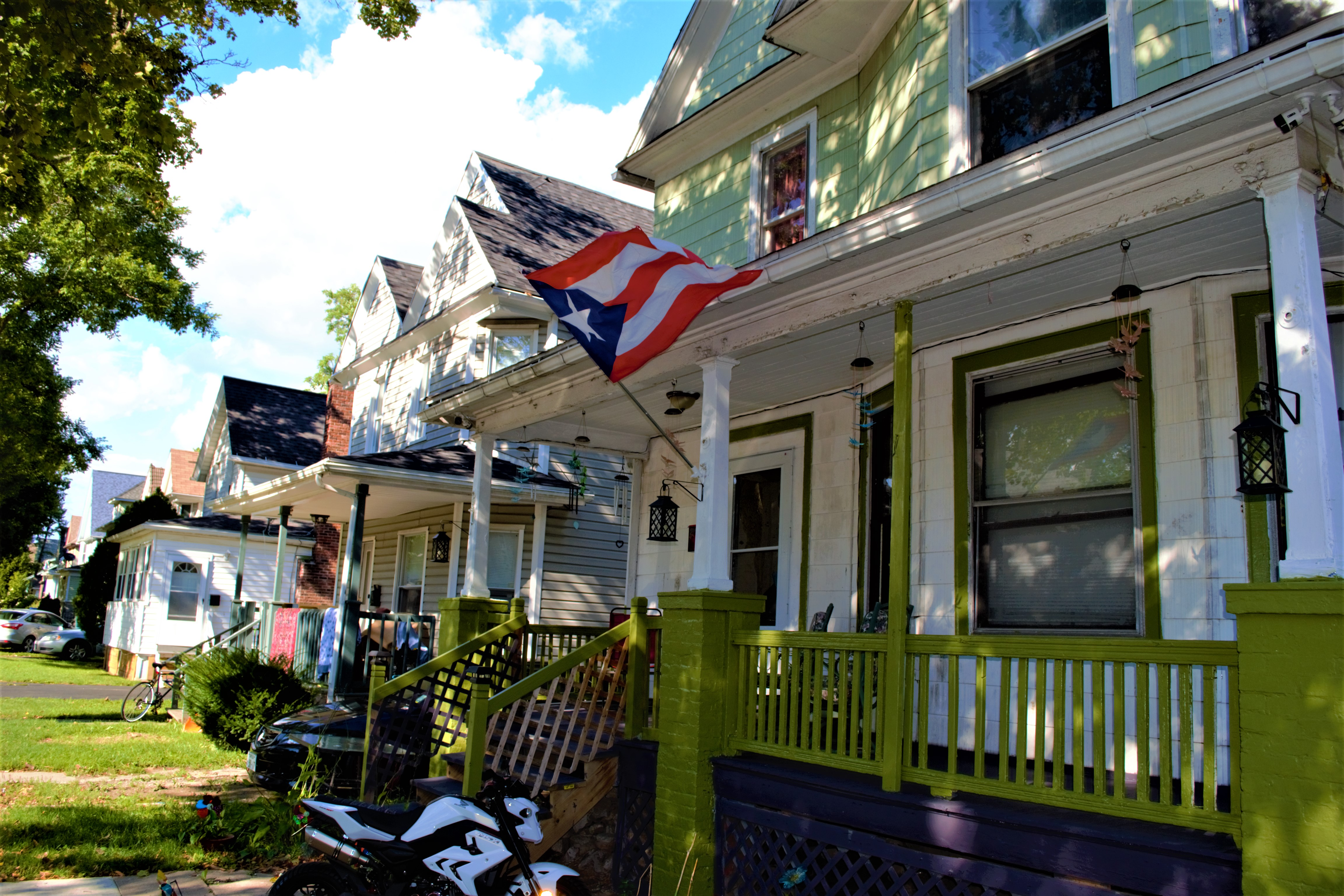
Edgerton's streets are filled with flags of different countries, states, and territories of origin, like this Puerto Rican flag.

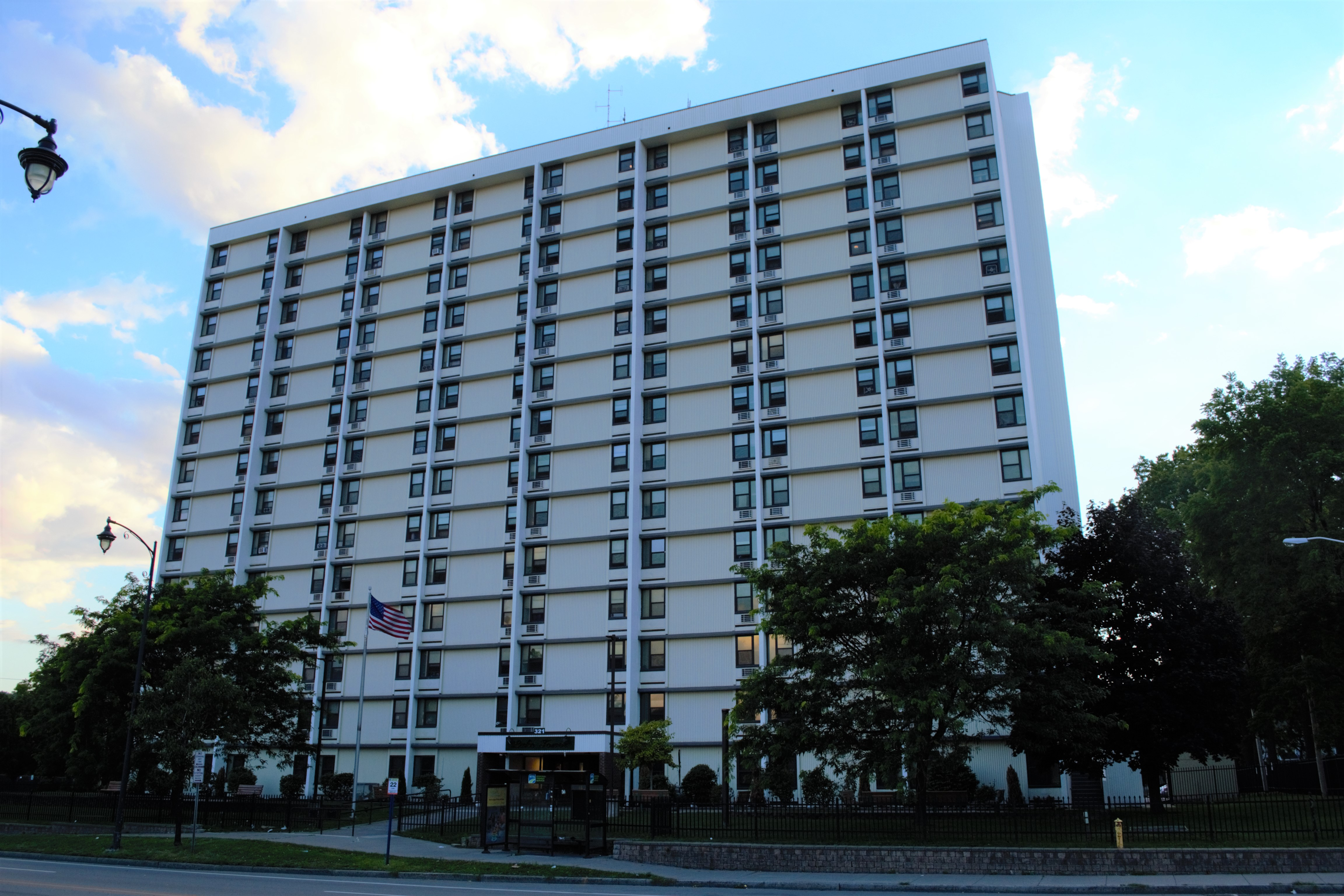
Lake Towers, the tallest building in Edgerton, is the second largest public housing complex in Rochester.

=== Public art ===
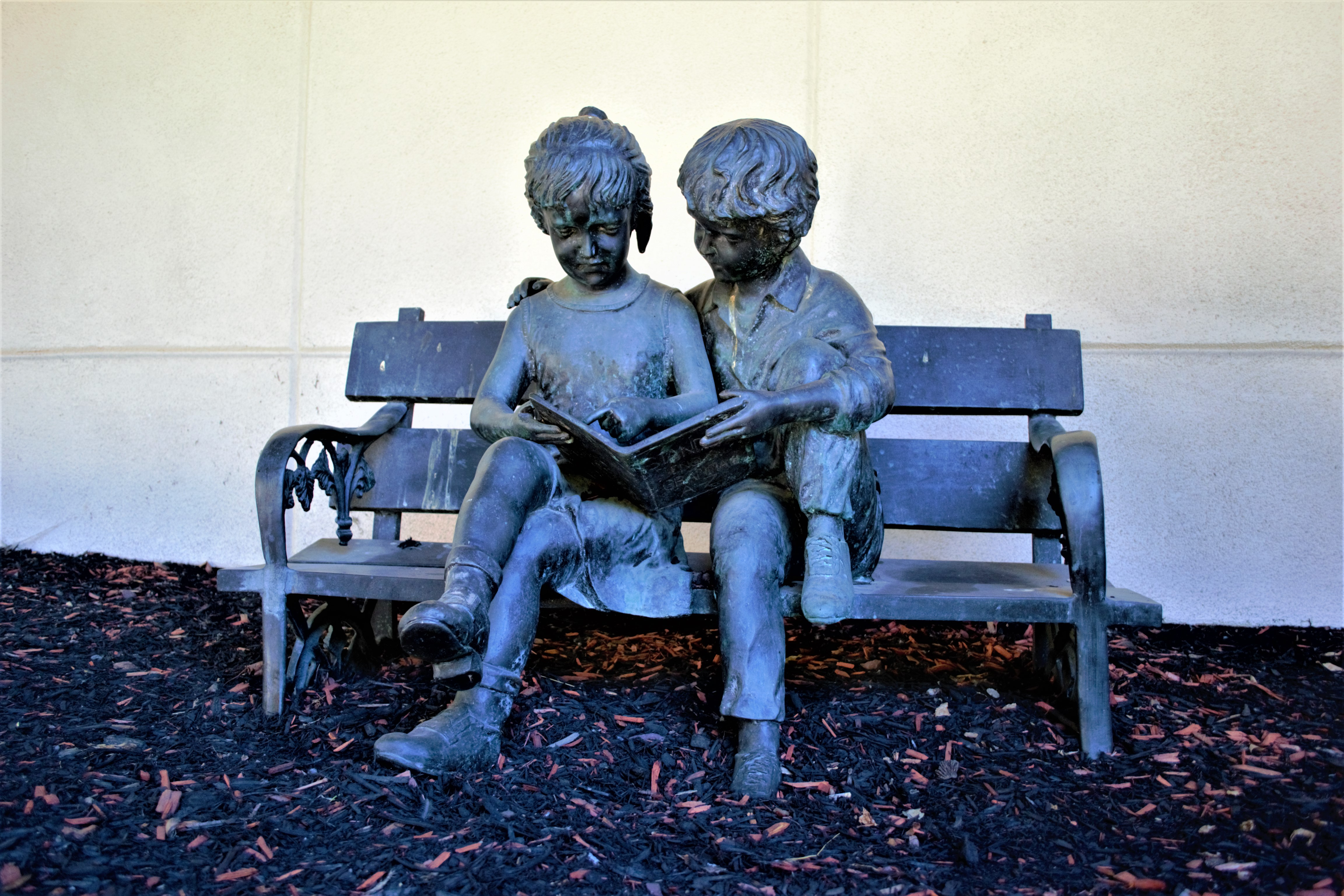
A statue of children reading to one another in front of the old School No. 57 building on Costar Street.

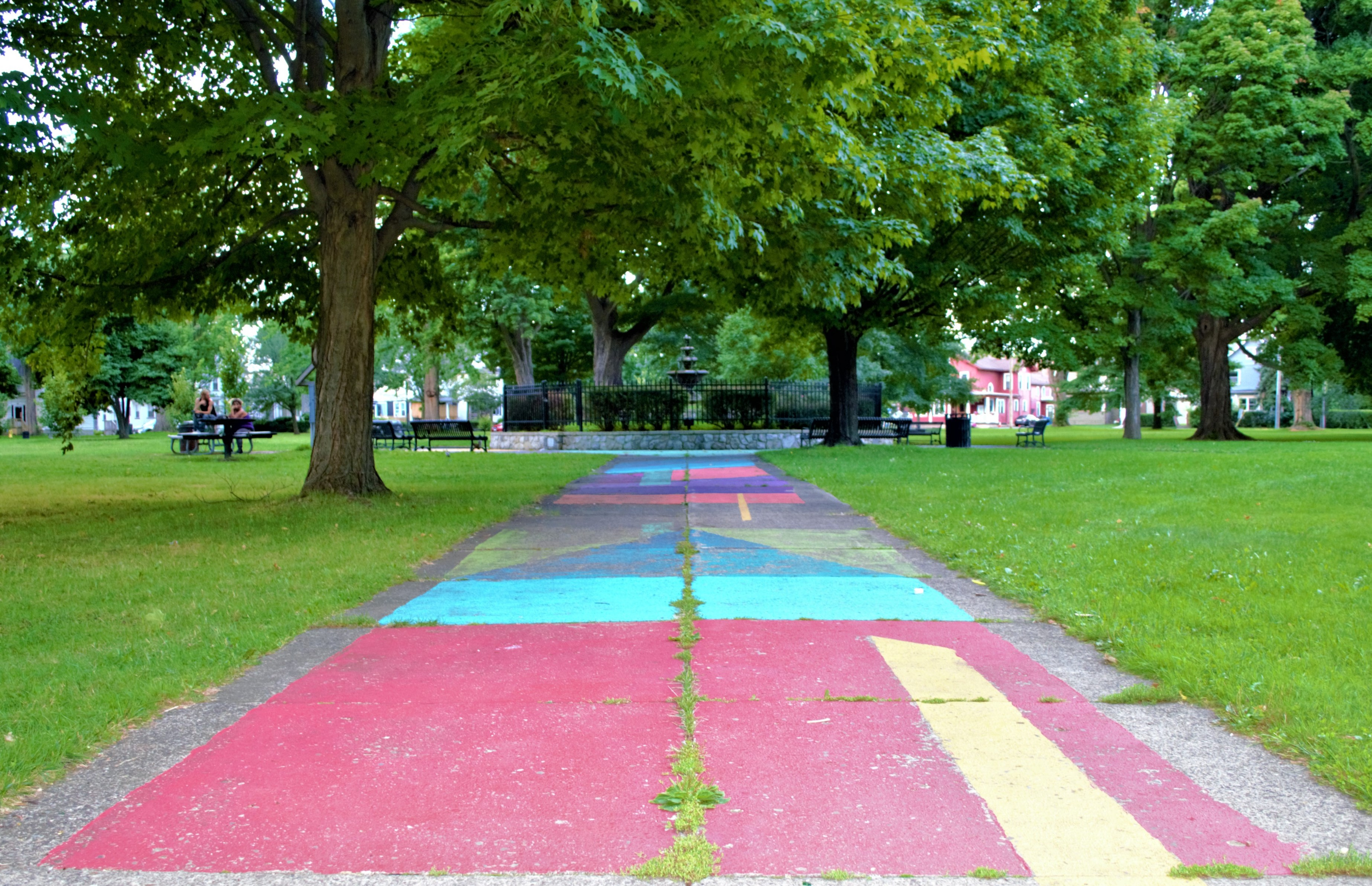
Abstract art painted on the walkways at Edgerton Square Park.

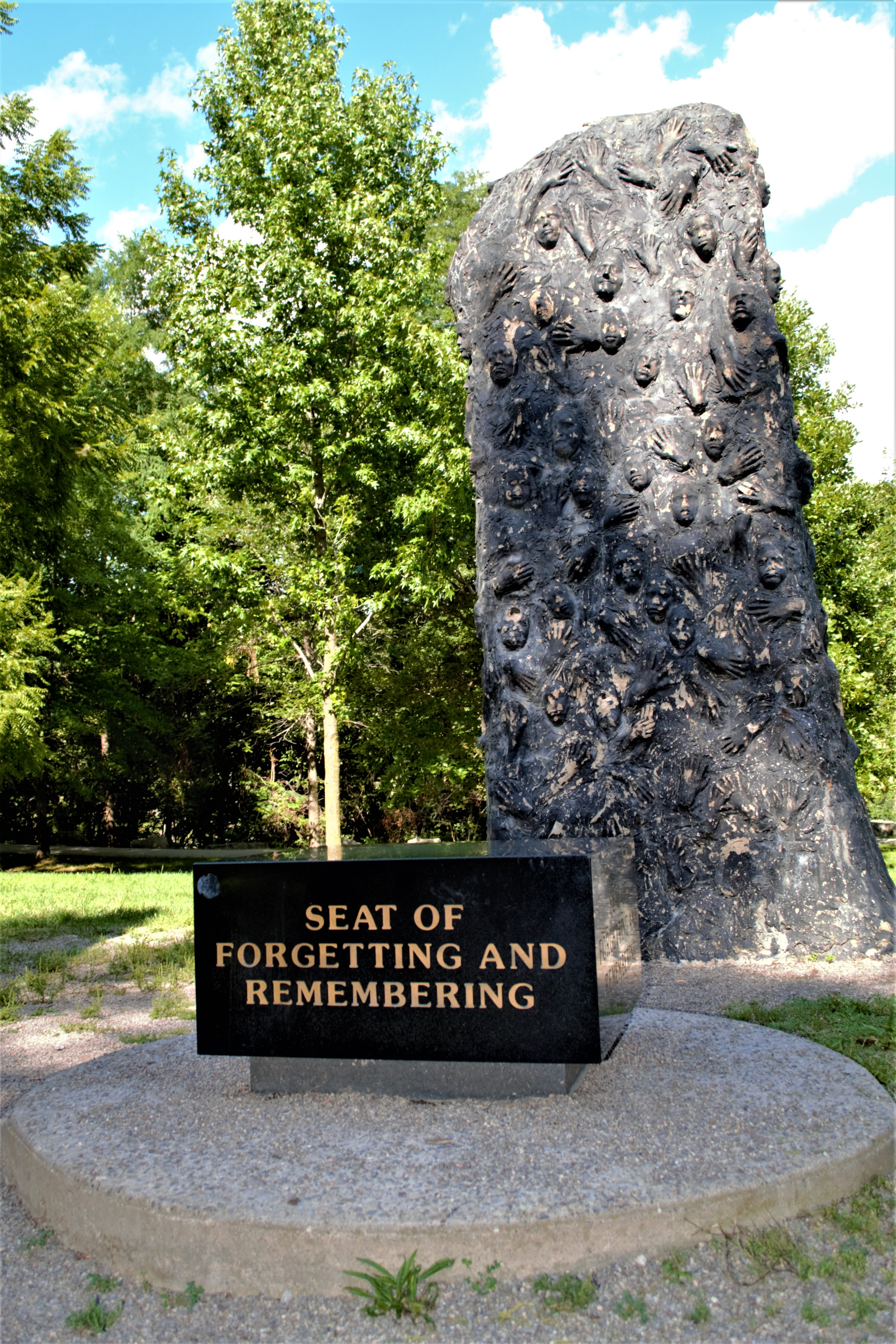
The Seat of Remembering and Forgetting, a 2001 piece by Adriana Ippel Slutzky on display at Lower Falls Park.
