= Holy Rosary Church (Rochester, New York) =

Historic church in New York, United States

- Holy Rosary Church Complex
- U.S. National Register of Historic Places
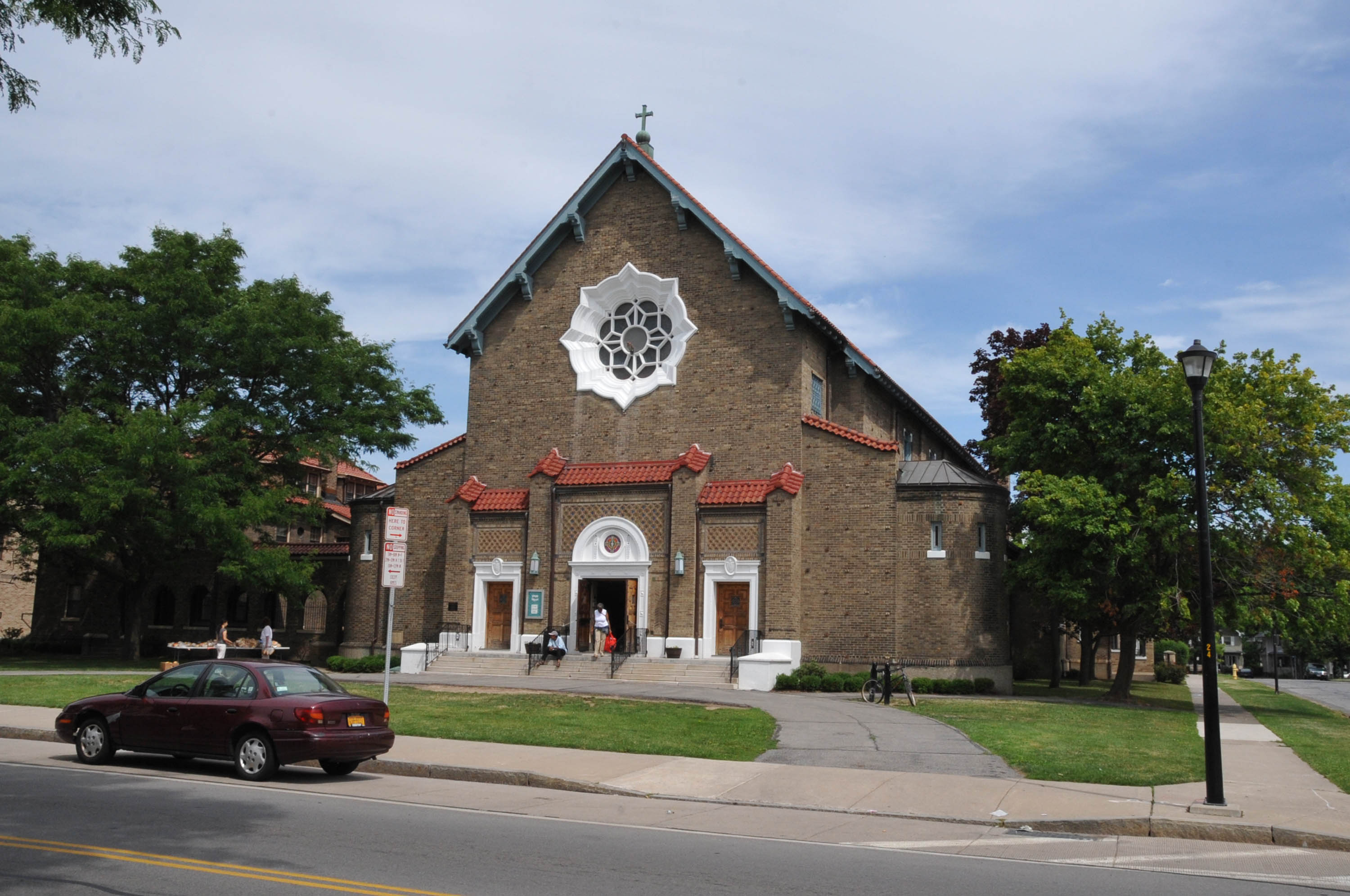
- Holy Rosary Church, January 2008

- Location within New York Location within the United States
- Location: 414 Lexington Ave., Rochester, New York
- Coordinates: 43°10′47″N 77°38′29″W
- Area: 1.9 acres (0.77 ha)
- Built: 1911, 1916, 1924, 1946
- Architect: Kauzer, John E., John T. Comes, Charles W. Eldridge
- Architectural style: Late 19th & Early 20th Century Revivals; Spanish eclectic; Arts and Crafts
- NRHP reference No.: 12000597
- Added to NRHP: September 4, 2012

Holy Rosary Church Complex is a historic Roman Catholic church complex located in the Edgerton neighborhood of Rochester, Monroe County, New York. The complex consists of the church (1916), rectory (c. 1916), convent (1911), and two-story garage. All buildings in the complex are in a Spanish eclectic, Arts and Crafts style. The buildings are constructed of hollow tile brick and three feature their original Spanish clay tile roofs. The church features a rose window in the Mudéjar style similar to that of the Mission San Carlos Borromeo de Carmelo. The church also features a square brick bell tower in the southwest corner.

The complex was listed on the National Register of Historic Places in 2012.
