= Thomas Jefferson High School (Rochester, New York) =

Defunct high school in New York, United States

Location
- Edgerton Park; Rochester, (Monroe County), New York 14608; United States
- Coordinates: 43.1711°N 77.6341°W

Information
- School type: Public school (government funded), combined middle and high school
- Status: closed
- Closed: c. 2012
- School district: Rochester City School District
- NCES District ID: 3624750
- CEEB code: 334866
- NCES School ID: 362475003367
- Faculty: 80.37 (on an FTE basis)
- Grades: 7–12
- Gender: Coeducational
- Enrollment: 956 (2010-2011 school year)
- Student to teacher ratio: 11.89
- Campus: City: Midsize
- Colors: Navy and Gold
- Mascot: Jaguars

Thomas Jefferson High School is a closed public high school located in Rochester, Monroe County, New York, U.S.A., and was one of many high schools operated by the Rochester City School District.

The building is currently used as the Rochester International Academy, a high school for students leaning English as a new language. Until 2020, the building is scheduled to be used as swing space for several elementary schools undergoing renovation, and will eventually become the permanent home to the RIA and a new K-8 school.
