= Lewiston Railroad =

Overview
- Locale: Lewiston, NY
- Dates of operation: 1836–1855
- Successor: New York Central Railroad (of 1853)

The Lewiston Railroad Company was an early railroad in Lewiston, NY, running to Niagara Falls, NY. The railroad eventually became a part of the New York Central Railroad system.

== History ==
On May 6, 1836, The Lewiston Rail-Road Company was incorporated in New York State. Its board of directors were Benjamin Barton, Bates Cooke, Lothrop Cooke, Joshua Fairbanks, Oliver Grace, Calvin Hotchkiss, Seymour Scovell, Leonard Shepard, Jacob Townsend, and Amos S. Tryon. The railroad was first built to connect the town of Lewiston, NY, with Lockport, NY, via the then existing Lockport and Niagara Falls Railroad. The Lewiston Railroad opened for operation in 1837.

The railroad first surveyed its route in 1835. The line started from the Niagara River wharves and the American Hotel in Lewiston, made a 'U' to climb from the river bank and followed along the streets heading east through Lewiston proper. The line then crossed several farms, climbing the Niagara Escarpment to the top of Indian Hill to meet with the Lockport and Niagara Falls Railroad at a point just west of the Tuscarora Reservation. The railroad cost $27,023.24 to build.

In 1850, the Lockport and Niagara Falls Railroad was foreclosed and folded into a new road named the Rochester, Lockport and Niagara Falls Railroad. This new railroad built a straight and more direct route between Lockport and Niagara Falls, NY, allowing it to abandon the original winding, strap railroad line of the Lockport and Niagara Falls Railroad in 1851. With the abandonment of the Lockport and Niagara Falls route, the Lewiston Railroad was also abandoned as there was no further use for it. Despite that, the Lewiston Railroad charter was sold to the Buffalo and Niagara Falls Railroad in 1851.

On December 22, 1853, the Buffalo and Niagara Falls Railroad and the Lewiston Railroad entered into an agreement with the New York Central Railroad, whereby the New York Central would operate the two roads.

The Lewiston Railroad had then began building a new route from the same starting point in Lewiston as the original line, but then headed south for about 5 miles to Suspension Bridge where the Grand Trunk Railway crossed the Niagara River into the US from Canada. In Suspension Bridge, line also met up with the Rome, Watertown and Ogdensburg Railroad, and connected with the Rochester, Lockport and Niagara Falls Railroad, the latter of which was used to make it all the way into Niagara Falls and a meet with the Buffalo and Niagara Falls Railroad, which owned the Lewiston Railroad.

On September 30, 1855, the Lewiston Railroad Company was merged into the New York Central Railroad Company.
