= Niagara Subdivision =

Railway line in New York

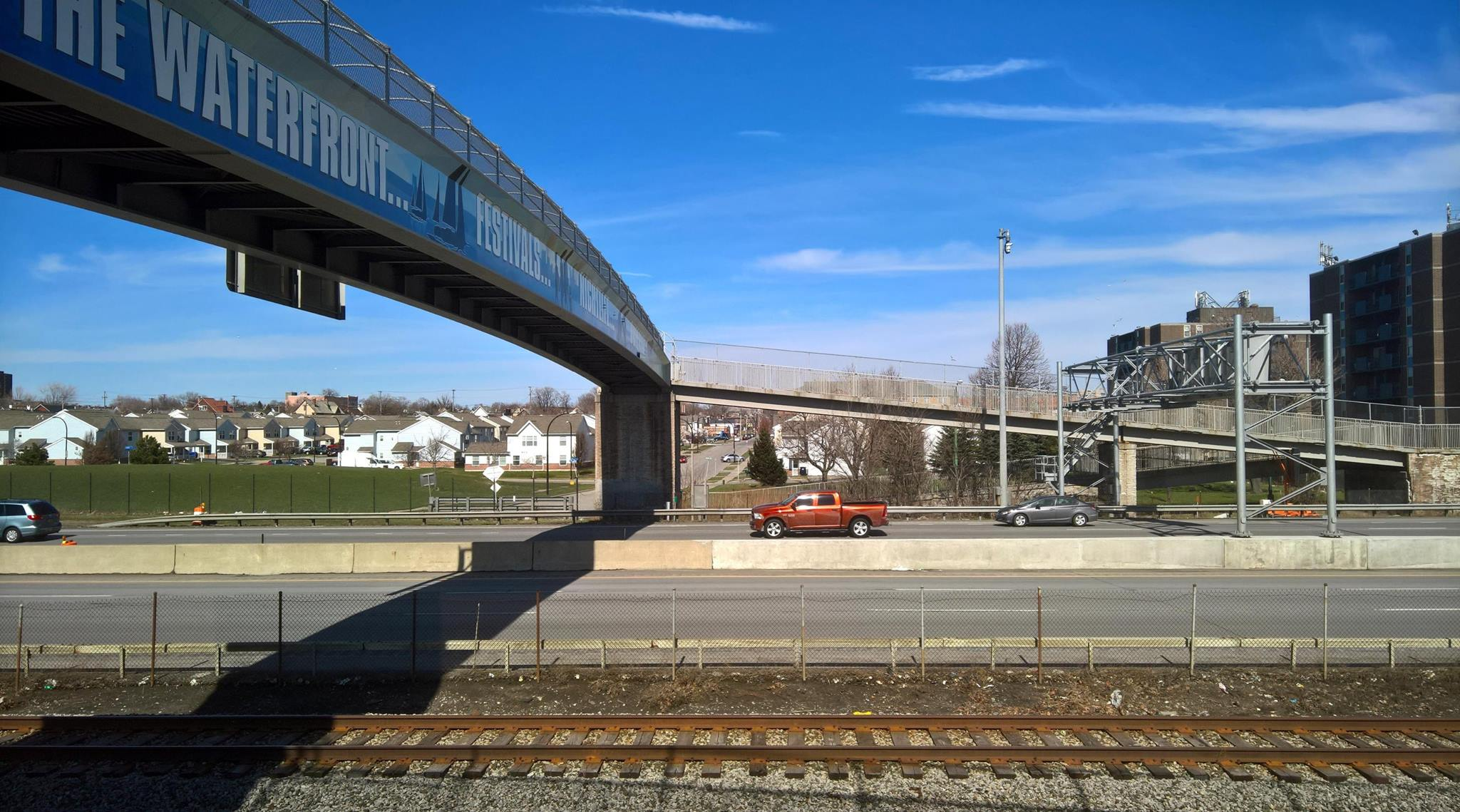
- The Niagara Subdivision running alongside Interstate 190 under the Hudson Street Pedestrian Bridge in Buffalo, New York

Overview
- Owner: CSX Transportation

History
- Opened: May 1, 1837

Technical
- Line length: 28.2 mi (45.4 km)
- Track gauge: 1,435 mm (4 ft 8 1/2 in) standard gauge

The Niagara Subdivision is a railroad line owned and operated by CSX Transportation in the U.S. state of New York. The line runs from Buffalo north and west to Niagara Falls. It was originally built by predecessors of the New York Central Railroad. In addition to freight trains, it hosts Amtrak's Maple Leaf and Empire Service passenger trains.

== History ==
The Buffalo and Niagara Falls Railroad opened between Buffalo, New York, and Niagara Falls, New York, on May 1, 1837. The Buffalo and Niagara Falls Railroad and the Buffalo and Lockport Railroad collaborated on a new alignment between Tonawanda, New York, and Buffalo. The New York Central Railroad completed this new route on December 1, 1854, after which the original line was abandoned.

The broad gauge Canandaigua and Niagara Falls Railroad opened between Canandaigua, New York, and Niagara Falls on July 1, 1853. The line ran roughly parallel to the Buffalo and Niagara Falls west of Tonawanda. The New York Central leased the Niagara Bridge and Canandaigua Railroad, successor to the Canandaigua and Niagara Falls, in 1858. Under the New York Central that line was re-gauged to standard gauge and the parallel Buffalo and Niagara Falls abandoned. The International Railway Bridge was completed in November 1873, giving the line a connection to Canada. The line was extended east over city streets (including the "Terrace") in 1879–1880, connecting with the main New York Central system at Exchange Street.

In 1923, the development of the New York State Canal System led to a relocation of the line in Tonawanda. The new longer alignment turned east south of downtown, and then north parallel to the Erie Railroad's Suspension Bridge and Erie Junction Railroad, merging with the old Canandaigua and Niagara Falls Railroad south of its bridge over the canal.

Under pressure from the city of Buffalo, the New York Central Railroad replaced the crosstown route with a tunnel on August 1, 1952.

In the early 1960s, the New York Central undertook a significant restructuring around Niagara Falls, including the elimination of over fifty grade crossings. As part of this work, the line to Niagara Falls was re-routed east of the city to join what is now the west end of the Lockport Subdivision. This new line opened in 1963. The old alignment was abandoned, and part of it was used in 1970 for the LaSalle Expressway.

Following the bankruptcy of Penn Central Transportation the line was conveyed to Conrail in 1976. It was assigned to CSX Transportation in the 1999 breakup of Conrail.

== Operation ==
The south end of the Niagara Subdivision is in Buffalo, just east of Buffalo–Exchange Street station, where it connects with the Buffalo Terminal Subdivision. The line runs north along the United States side of the Niagara River through Tonawanda to a junction with the Lockport Subdivision just north of Niagara Falls International Airport. There the line turns west and runs to the Canada–United States border at the Whirlpool Bridge. Amtrak's Maple Leaf and Empire Service operate over the line.

== See also ==
- List of CSX Transportation lines
