= Charlotte–Genesee Lighthouse =

Charlotte-Genesee Lighthouse
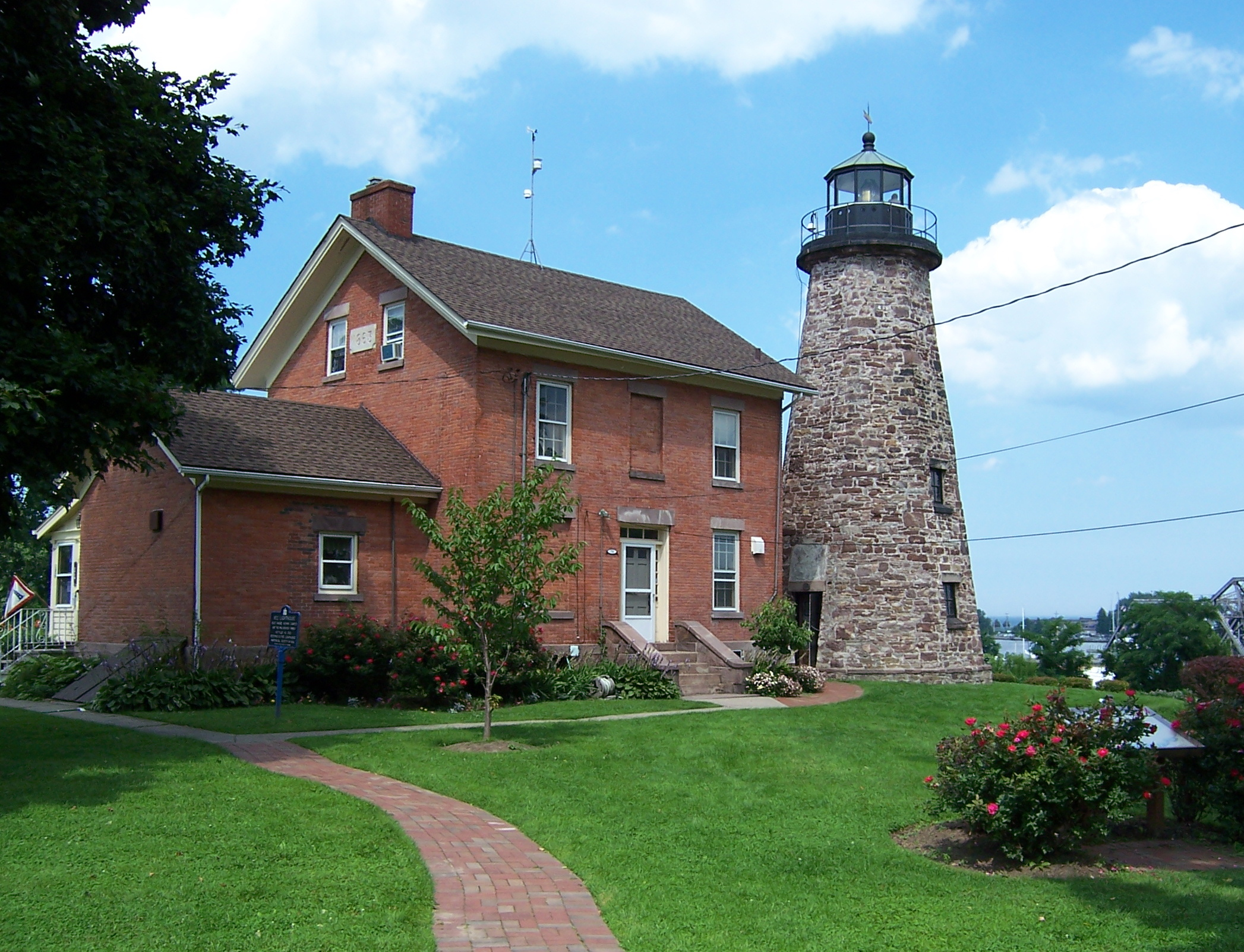
- Charlotte-Genesee Lighthouse
- Location: 70 Lighthouse St., Rochester, New York
- Coordinates: 43°15′10″N 77°36′40″W

Tower
- Constructed: 1822
- Construction: Stone, white tower
- Height: 40 feet (12 m)
- Shape: Octagonal
- Heritage: National Register of Historic Places listed place

Light
- First lit: 1822
- Deactivated: Active
- Focal height: 14 m (46 ft)
- Lens: Fourth order Fresnel lens
- Range: 9 nautical miles (17 km; 10 mi)
- Characteristic: White, Fixed
- Charlotte-Genesee Lighthouse
- U.S. National Register of Historic Places
- NRHP reference No.: 74001259
- Added to NRHP: August 13, 1974

The Charlotte–Genesee Lighthouse is an 1822 stone octagonal lighthouse in the Charlotte neighborhood in northern Rochester, New York, United States. The 40 ft (12 m) tower is located on Lake Ontario at the mouth of the Genesee River. It originally had 10 whale oil Argand lamps, which were replaced with a Fresnel lens in 1853.

On February 28, 1881, the lighthouse was turned off. After nearby piers changed the mouth of the river, it was far from the water. The light was then moved to a pier in 1884.

In 1965, Charlotte High School students started a letter writing campaign to save the lighthouse from impending destruction. It was declared surplus in 1981 by the government. It is now owned by Monroe County and managed as a museum by the Charlotte Genesee Lightouse Historical Society, a nonprofit volunteer organization.

It is part of the Seaway Trail, a National Scenic Byway. It is listed on the National Register of Historic Places and is also a City of Rochester Landmark. It is open to the public.

As of 2014, the lighthouse is active, and listed in the United States Coast Guard Light List as light number 2333.
