= Buffalo and Black Rock Railroad =

Overview
- Locale: Buffalo, New York
- Dates of operation: 1833–1851

Technical
- Length: 3 miles (4.8 km)

The Buffalo and Black Rock Railroad was a railway company in the United States. It was incorporated in 1833 and opened a horsecar line between Buffalo, New York, and Black Rock, New York, in 1834. Often considered a predecessor of the Buffalo and Niagara Falls Railroad, the two operated side-by-side into the 1850s, when the former ceased operation.

== History ==
The Buffalo and Black Rock Railroad was incorporated on April 29, 1833. The railroad began operating between Buffalo, New York, and Black Rock, New York, toward the end of May 1834. In Buffalo, the line began at the intersection of Pearl and Crow (now Exchange Street), ran northwest on Terrace to Court, west on Court to Third, and then turned northwest, running along the north side of the Erie Canal. The Buffalo and Niagara Falls Railroad, incorporated in 1834, followed the Buffalo and Black Rock as far as Court and Terrace, but then continued northwest on Sixth Street. The line was worked by horses, and connected with the ferry in Black Rock.

The disposition of the railroad is unclear. The widening of the Erie Canal in the late 1840s caused enough disruption for the railroad to receive compensation from the state government. In 1851, the city of Buffalo demanded that the railroad cease running on public streets. An 1854 newspaper article claimed that the Buffalo, Brantford and Goderich Railroad had "purchased the right of way of the old Buffalo and Black Rock Railroad in our city...".

During the 1910s and 1920s the Interstate Commerce Commission, working with the railroads, undertook an inventory of all railroads then operating in the United States. The results were published in a series of valuation reports. The valuation report for the New York Central Railroad asserted that the Buffalo and Niagara Falls Railroad acquired the Buffalo and Black Rock in 1834 and incorporated its line into the line to Niagara Falls.
