= Wilson Magnet High School =

Joseph C. Wilson Magnet High School
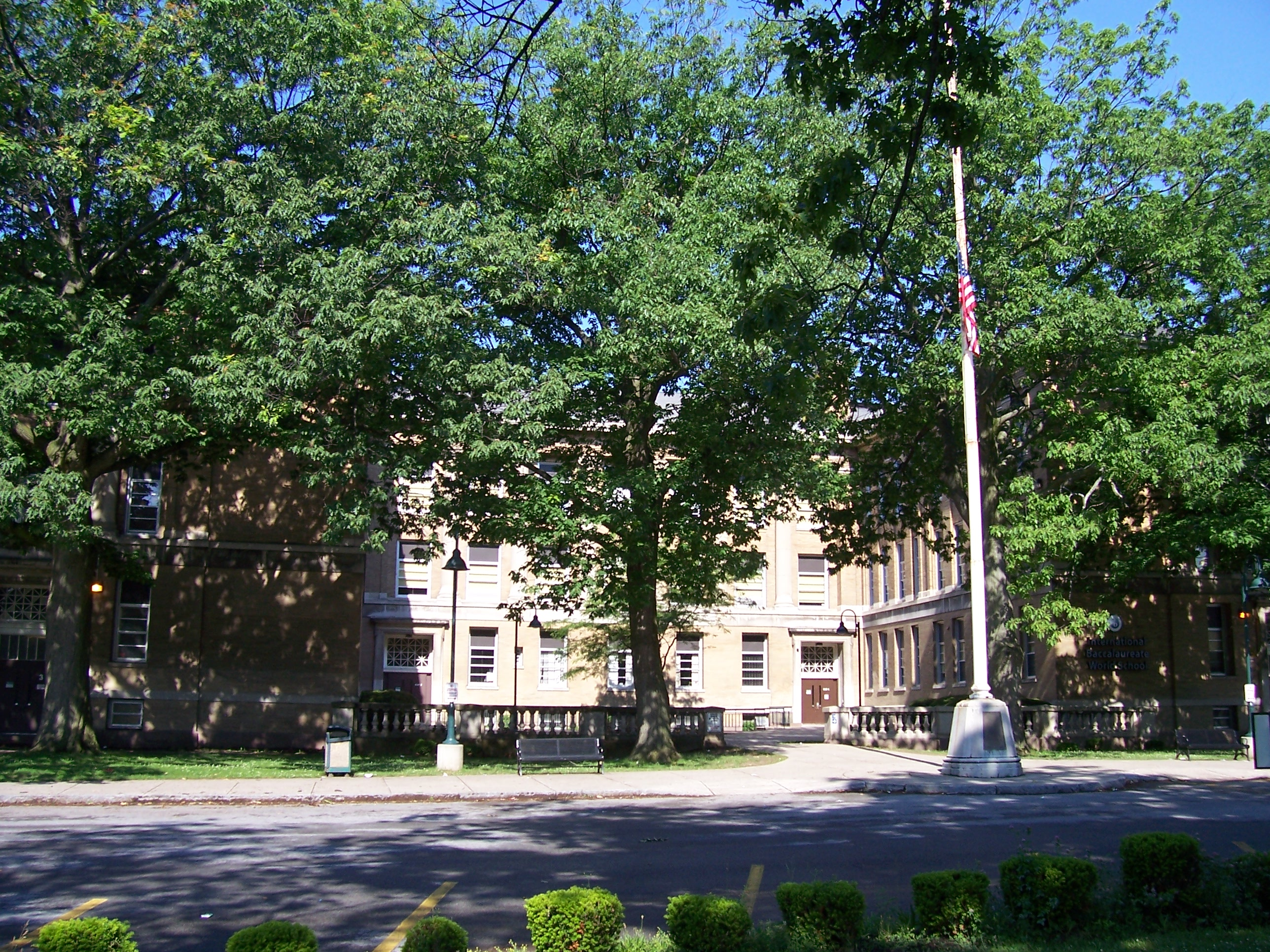

Location
- 501 Genesee St; Rochester, New York 14611; United States
- Coordinates: 43°8′25″N 77°38′15″W

Information
- Type: Public
- Established: 1905
- School district: Rochester City School District
- NCES School ID: 362475003422
- Principal: Gary Reynolds
- Teaching staff: 76.08 (on an FTE basis)
- Grades: 9-12
- Enrollment: 821 (2025-2026)
- Student to teacher ratio: 9.32
- Campus: Urban
- Colors: Black, Red and White
- Mascot: Willie the Wildcat
- Newspaper: Wildcat Times
- Website: www.rcsdk12.org/Domain/4840

Joseph C. Wilson Magnet High School, sometimes referred to as Wilson Magnet or just Wilson, is a public high school in Rochester, New York. It is in the Rochester City School District.

== Performance ==
Wilson Magnet performs better than other high schools in the Rochester school district, but is still below state averages in terms of standardized testing. Wilson is an International Baccalaureate World School.

== Notable alumni ==
- Mary E. Clarke, director of the Women's Army Corps and the first woman to attain the rank of major general in the United States Army
- Malik Evans, 70th Mayor of Rochester
- Saul A. Maneiro, Monroe County Legislator
- William Andrew "Bill" Saturno, American archaeologist and Mayanist scholar who has made significant contributions toward the study of the pre-Columbian Maya civilization.
- Lovely A. Warren, 69th Mayor of Rochester, New York
- Luke Wood, music executive and president of Beats Electronics from 2011 to 2020
- Hon. Stephen T. Miller, New York Court of Claims Judge Rochester, New York

== See also ==
- Rochester City School District
- Sibley–Elmdorf Historic District
