= Rochester City School District =

School district in the U.S. state of New York

Location
- Rochester, New York

District information
- Type: Public
- Motto: Every child is a work of art. Create a masterpiece.
- Grades: Pre-kindergarten, K-12, Incarcerated Youth High School, Adult Evening High School
- Established: 1841; 185 years ago
- Superintendent: Dr. Eric Jay Rosser
- Accreditation: New York State Board of Regents
- Schools: 60 pre-K sites 40 elementary 19 secondary 1 Montessori; 1 program for young mothers 1 family/adult learning center
- Budget: ▼US$693.7 million (2010–2011)

Students and staff
- Students: 26,057 children 10,000 adults
- Teachers: 3,900 (2010–2011)
- Staff: 300 administrators 2,300 support personnel (2010–2011)
- Student–teacher ratio: 8.1:1 (2011)

Other information
- Unions: NYSUT, Rochester Teachers Association
- Website: rcsdk12.org

The Rochester City School District is a public school district that serves approximately 21,000 students in the city of Rochester, New York. The Rochester City School District (RCSD) spends approximately $30,972 per student in the 2024-2025 school year. This cost is based on the district's adopted budget of $1,071,659,143 and a student enrollment of 34,601, according to the district's website. This is, according to Census Bureau data, more than the New York State average of $29,873 per student, and much higher than the national average of $15,633 per student.

== Organization ==
The school district is run by a board of education that sets school policy and approves school spending. The board hires a superintendent under contract to carry out its policies.

=== Board of education ===
The board of education consists of seven members, elected biennially, who serve staggered four-year terms.

The current board members are:

- Cynthia Elliott, President
  - Board Liaison to: Abraham Lincoln School No. 22, Dr. Alice Holloway Young School of Excellence, Dr. Martin Luther King, Jr. School No. 9, Franklin Lower and Upper Schools, Leadership Academy for Young Men, Rochester International Academy
  - Term Expires: December 2025
- Beatriz LeBron, Vice President
  - Board Liaison to: All City High, James Monroe Lower and Upper Schools, Clara Barton School No. 2, Virgil I. Grissom School No. 7, Anna Murray-Douglass Academy School No. 12, Children's School of Rochester School No. 15, Dr. Charles T. Lunsford School School No. 19, Adlai E. Stevenson School No. 29
  - Term Expires: December 2028
- Isaiah Santiago, Commissioner
  - Board Liaison to: Northeast College Preparatory High School, Northwest Junior High, Wilson Foundation Academy, Roberto Clemente School No. 8, Dr. Walter Cooper Academy School No. 10, John Walton Spencer School School No. 16, Pinnacle School No. 35, Andrew J. Townson School No. 39, and Rochester Early Childhood Education Center (RECEC)
  - Term Expires: December 2028
- Amy Maloy, Commissioner
  - Board Liaison to: LyncX Academy, Home Hospital Instruction, NorthSTAR, School of the Arts, John Williams School No. 5, Dr. Louis A. Cerulli School No. 34, Montessori Academy School School No. 53, World of Inquiry School School No. 58
  - Term Expires: December 2028
- James Patterson, Commissioner
  - Board Liaison to: OACES Program, Youth and Justice Program, Enrico Fermi School No. 17, Charles Carroll School No. 46, Helen Barrett Montgomery School No. 50, Flower City School No. 54
  - Term Expires: December 2025
- Jaqueline Griffin, Commissioner
  - Board Liaison to: School Without Walls, Francis Parker School No. 23, Nathaniel Hawthorne School No. 25, Henry Hudson School No. 28, John James Audubon School No. 33, Mary McLeod Bethune School No. 45, Frank Fowler Dow School No. 52
  - Term Expires: December 2028
- Camille Simmons, Commissioner
  - Board Liaison to: Edison Career & Technology High School, P-Tech Pathways to Technology at Edison, Joseph C. Wilson Magnet High School, Rochester Early College International High School, Rochester Preschool Parent Program, Rise Community School No. 106, George Mather Forbes School No. 4, Abelard Reynolds School No. 42
  - Term Expires: December 2025

=== Superintendent and supporting team ===
Past superintendents
Name	Tenure	Name	Tenure
Isaac F. Mack	1841–1845	John M. Franco	March 1, 1971 – June 16, 1971 (acting); June 17, 1971 – 1980
Samuel L. Selden	January 1, 1846 – November 1, 1846	Laval Wilson	1980 – 1985
Belden R. McAlpine	November 2, 1846 – 1847	Peter J. McWalters	1985 (acting); 1986–1992
Daniel Holbrook	1847–1850; 1857–1858; 1862–1864	Manuel J. Rivera	1992–1994; September 1, 2002 – April 30, 2007
Reuben D. Jones	1850–1856	Loretta Johnson	1994–1995 (acting)
Isaac S. Hobbie	1856–1857	Clifford B. Janey	1995 – August 31, 2002
Philip H. Curtis	1858–1861	William C. Cala	2007 – December 31, 2007 (interim)
Charles N. Simmons	1864–1869; 1876–1878; 1881–1882	Jean-Claude Brizard	January 1, 2008 – May 13, 2011
Sylvanus A. Ellis	1869–1875; 1882–1892	Bolgen T. Vargas	May 16, 2011 – December 31, 2015
Alonzo L. Mabbett	1878–1881	Daniel G. Lowengard	January 1 – 15, 2016 (interim)
Milton Noyes	1892–1900	Linda L. Cimusz	January 18, 2016 – July 2016 (interim)
Charles B. Gilbert	1901–1909	Barbara Deane Williams	August 8, 2016 – January 31, 2019
Clarence F. Carroll	1903–1911	Daniel G. Lowengard	February 1, 2019 – June 2019 (interim)
Herbert S. Weet	1911–1933	Terry J. Dade	July 2019 – May 2020
James M. Spinning	1934 – November 1, 1954	Lesli C. Myers-Small	May 2020 – September 2022
Howard C. Seymour	November 1, 1954 – December 31, 1960	Carmine Peluso	September 2022 - January 2023 (interim); January 2023 - June 2024
James S. Wishart	January 1, 1961 – August 31, 1961 (acting)	Demario Strickland	June 2024 - June 2025 (interim)
Robert L. Springer	September 1, 1961 – May 31, 1963	Eric J. Rosser	July 1, 2025 - Present
Herman R. Goldberg	June 1, 1963 – July 31, 1963 (acting); August 1, 1963 – March 1, 1971		

== Facilities ==
=== Schools ===
In 2024, the district completed a grade-level and school reconfiguration. Elementary Schools are grades PK-6, Middle Schools are grades 7-8, and High Schools are grades 9-12 (unless otherwise noted).

==== Pre-Kindergarten Centers ====
- Florence S. Brown PreK Center at School No. 33 (PreK), Program Administrator - Dr. Eileen Eller
- Rochester Early Childhood Education Center NE (PreK–1), Director - Lisa Whitlow
- Rochester Preschool Parent Program, Director - Rebecca Boyle

==== Elementary schools ====
- George Mather Forbes School No. 4 (PreK–6), Principal - Karon Jackson, Assistant Principal - Delores Davis
- John Williams School No. 5 (PreK–6), Principal - Tiffany Lee, Assistant Principals - George Lombrado
- Virgil I. Grissom School No. 7 (PreK–6), Principal - David Lincoln, Assistant Principal - Mark Wilkins
- Roberto Clemente School No. 8 (PreK–6), Principal - Stephanie Thompson, Assistant Principals - Andrew Grantham
- Dr. Martin Luther King Jr. School No. 9 (PreK–6), Principal - Sharon Jackson, Assistant Principals - Burnice Green and Maria Ortiz-Viera
- Anna Murray-Douglass Academy No. 12 (PreK–6), Principal - Anthony Rodriquez, Assistant Principals - Margaret Crowley and Faith Hart
- The Children's School of Rochester No. 15 (PreK–6), - Principal - Jay Piper, Assistant Principal - Chanta Willis
- Dr. David and Ruth Anderson School No. 16 (PreK–6), Principal - Ryan Clair, Assistant Principal - Eileen Kalbfus
- Enrico Fermi School No. 17 (PreK–6), Principal - Damaris Saltares, Assistant Principals - David Dorsey and Meybhol Spaienza
- Dr. Charles T. Lunsford School No. 19 (PreK–6), Principal -Andrea Lee, Assistant Principal - Elizabeth Cross
- Abraham Lincoln School No. 22 (PreK–6), Principal - Clinton Bell, Assistant Principal - Michele White
- Francis Parker School No. 23 (PreK–6), Principal - Kathryn Yarlett-Fenti, Assistant Principal - Carla Roberts
- Nathaniel Hawthorne School No. 25 (PreK–6), Principal - Adrienne Steflik, Assistant Principal - Melody Bishop
- Henry Hudson School No. 28 (K–8), Principal - Susan Ladd, Assistant Principals - Brenda Harrington and Jenny Blaise-Schmidt
- John James Audubon School No. 33 (PreK–6), Principal - Lisa Garrow, Assistant Principals - Eileen Eller (Florence S. Brown PreK), Kristal Haines (Blue House), Michelle Killings (Gray House), and Lisa Prtichard (Gold House)
- Ida B. Wells-Barnett Elementary School No. 34 (PreK–6), Principal - Akilah Collins, Assistant Principal - Mia Sinclair
- Pinnacle School No. 35 (K–6), Principal - Valerie L Holberton, Assistant Principal - Maria Petrella
- Abelard Reynolds School No. 42 (PreK–6), Principal - Deborah Washington, Assistant Principal - Vaughn Collins
- Mary McLeod Bethune School No. 45 (PreK–6), Principal - Christine Manuele-Turnquist, Assistant Principal - Patricia Brockler and Jody Durick
- Austin Steward School No. 46 (PreK–6), Principal - Gina DiTullio, Assistant Principal - Katelyn Clark
- Helen Barrett Montgomery School No. 50 (PreK–8), Principal - Lakisha Taylor, Assistant Principal - Felecia Drysdale and Lynda Mortis
- Frank Fowler Dow School No. 52 (PreK–6), Principal - Richard Smith, Assistant Principal - Redell Freeman
- Montessori Academy School No. 53 (PreK–6), Principal - Djinga St. Louis, Assistant Principal - Elisa Ruise
- The Flower City School No. 54 (PreK–6), Principal - Demitria Lawton-Greggs, Assistant Principal - Stacey Sookram
- World of Inquiry School No. 58 (K–12), Principal (Acting) - Callie Andler, Assistant Principals - Stephen Campe, Megan Comstock, Jessica Flanders

==== Middle Schools ====
- Andrew Langston Middle School (7-8), Principal - Wakili Moore, Assistant Principal - Ajoua Jackson, Adam Rodger
- Dr. Freddie Thomas Middle School (7-8), Principal - Stephanie Harris, Assistant Principals - Terry Richards, Catherine Tesoriero
- East Lower School (6–8), Principal - LeAndrew Wingo, Assistant Principals - Jeffrey Halsdorfer, and Joseph Saia
- Loretta Johnson Middle School (7-8), Principal - Moniek Silas-Lee, Assistant Principals - Yarritza Delgado and Thomas Anderson
- Northwest Junior High at Douglass (7-8), Principal - Rodney Moore, Assistant Principals - Kathleen Orem and Alexci Reyes
- Thurgood Marshall Middle School (7-8), Principal - Nakia Burrows, Assistant Principals- Carey Belair and William Hucks

==== Secondary schools ====
- East Upper School (9–12), Principal - Caterina Leone-Mannino (acting), Freshman Academy Director - Deon Rodgers, Freshman Academy Assistant Principal - Callie Andler, Grades 10-12 Assistant Principals - Akua Kankam, Stephanie Bliss-Walker, and Michele Sadik
- Edison Career & Technology High School (9–12), Principal - LaCassa Felton, Assistant Principals - Pina Buonomo, Steve Humphry, Heidi Jackson, Jerome Vacca, Michael Samuel
- James Monroe Upper School (9–12), Principal - Jason Muhammad, Assistant Principals - Anthony Bianchi, Bernadette Regan, and Reyita Perez
- Joseph C. Wilson Magnet High School (9–12), Principal - Gary Reynolds, Assistant Principals - Chantal Lischer, Kimberly Brown, and Timothy Graziano
- Padilla High School at the Franklin Campus (9-12), Principal - Adam Rodger (Acting), Academy Director - Kristin Pryor
- Rochester Early College International High School (9–12), Principal - Sean Coffey

, Assistant Principals - Jennifer Monroe-DeWitz, Abraham Steiner, Hedli Jackson and David Dorsey

- School of the Arts (7–12), Principal - Alan Tirre, Assistant Principals - Samantha Brody, Brian Chandler, and Elimy Buss, Athletic Director - Richard Roche, Arts Center Director - Andrea Gregoire
- School Without Walls (9–12), Principal - Aylin Rodriguez, Assistant Principal - Jennifer DeFranco

==== School and alternative programs ====
- All City High (10–12), Principal - Armando Ramirez, Assistant Principal - Nicole Littlewood, Academy Director - Susen Hart
- Family Learning Center at OACES - Program Administrator - Paul Burke
- Home Hospital Instruction (7–12), Director - Christopher Smith
- LyncX Academy (7–12), Director - Christopher Smith
- NorthSTAR Program, Director of Alternative Education Programs - James Nunez
- Rochester International Academy, Principal - Mary Andrecolich-Montesano
- Youth & Justice, Director - Christopher Smith

==== Former schools ====
- Charlotte High School - closed 2016
- John Marshall High School - closed 2014
- Clara Barton School No. 2 - Closed 2024
- Dr. Walter Cooper Academy School No. 10 - Closed 2024
- Adlai E. Stevenson School No. 29 - Closed 2024
- Andrew J. Townson School No. 39 - Closed 2024
- Leadership Academy for Young Men High School - Closed 2022
- Martin B. Anderson School No. 1 - Closed 2017

==== Gallery ====
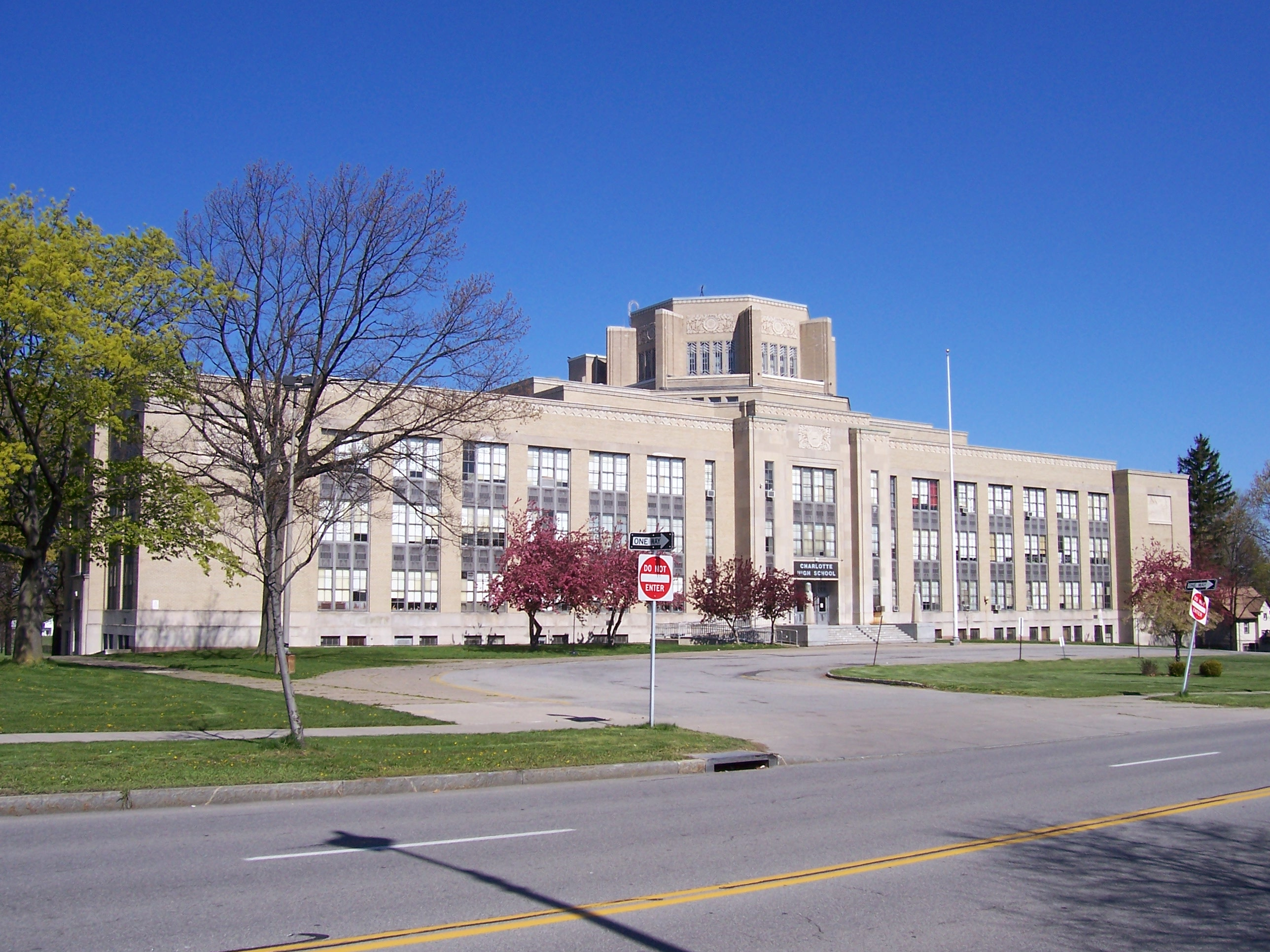
Charlotte

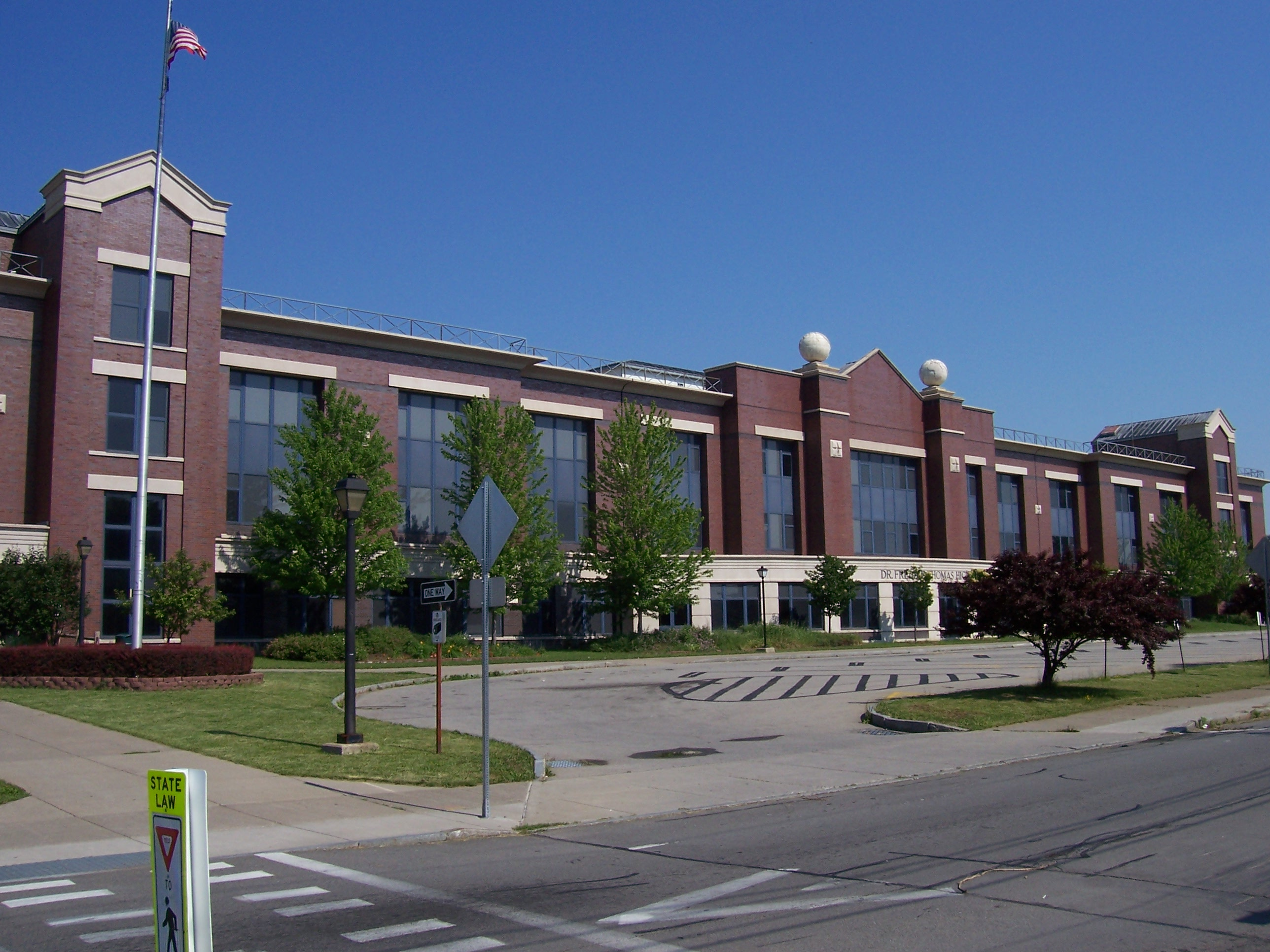
Dr. Freddie Thomas

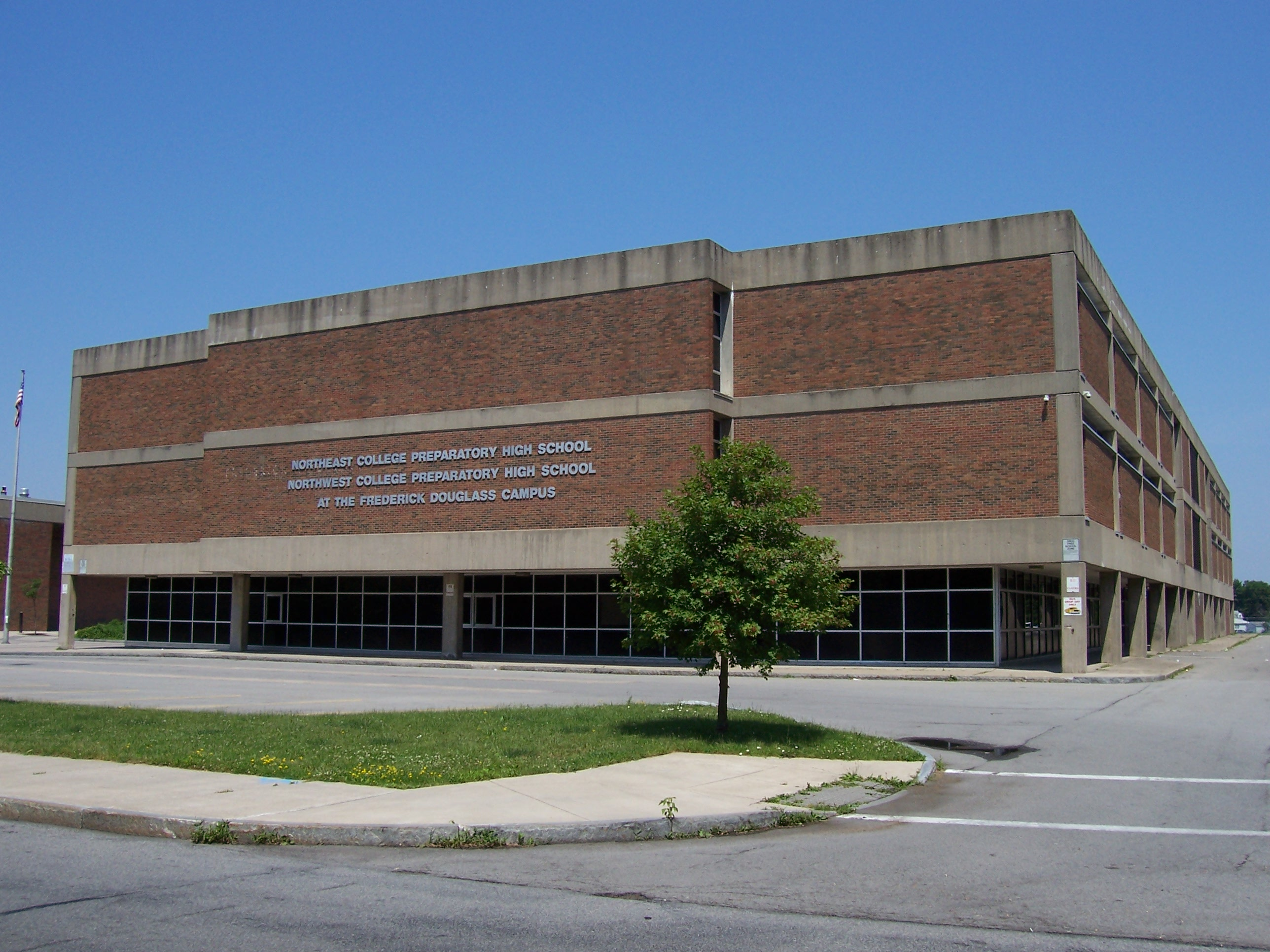
Douglass

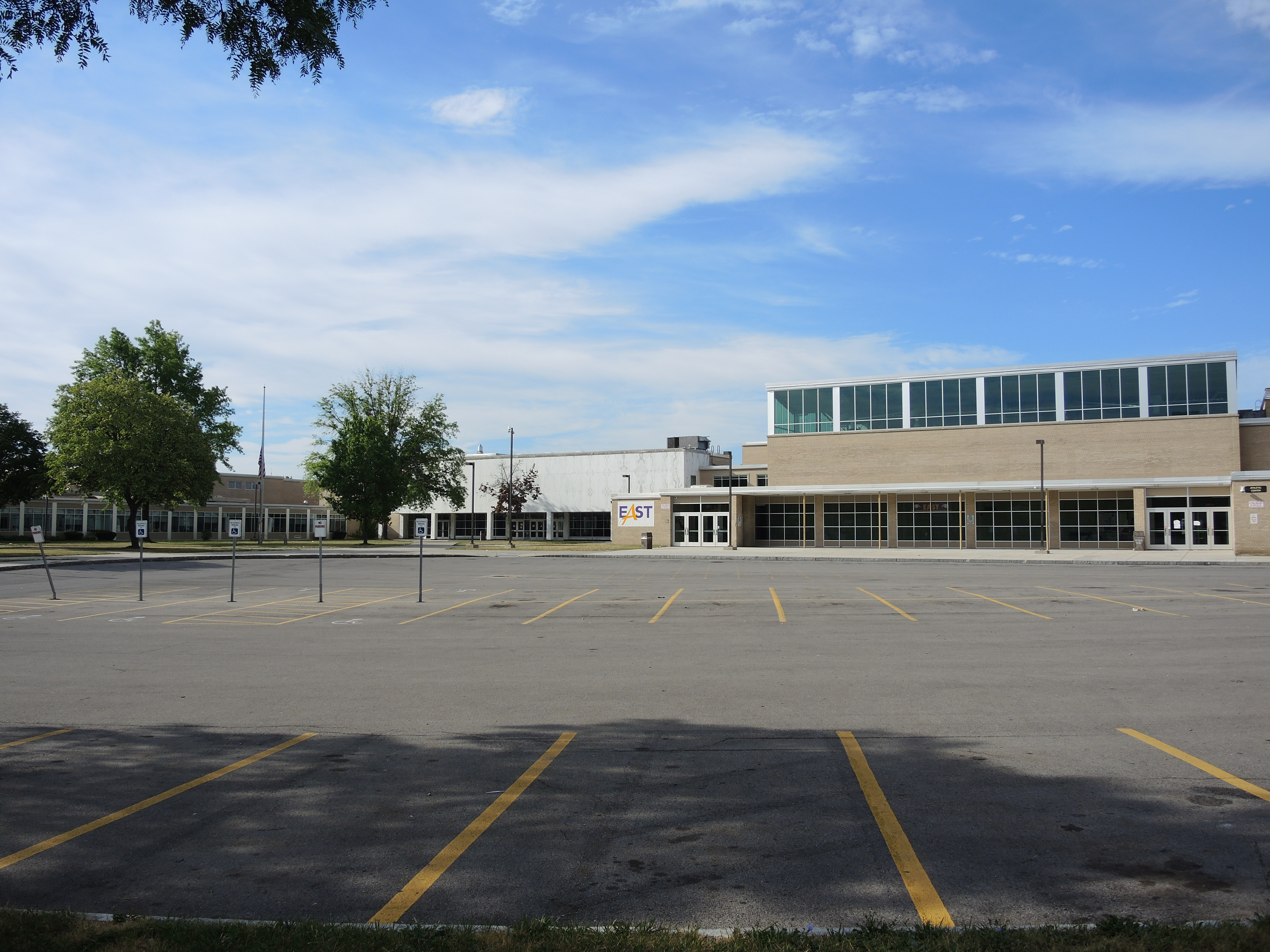
East

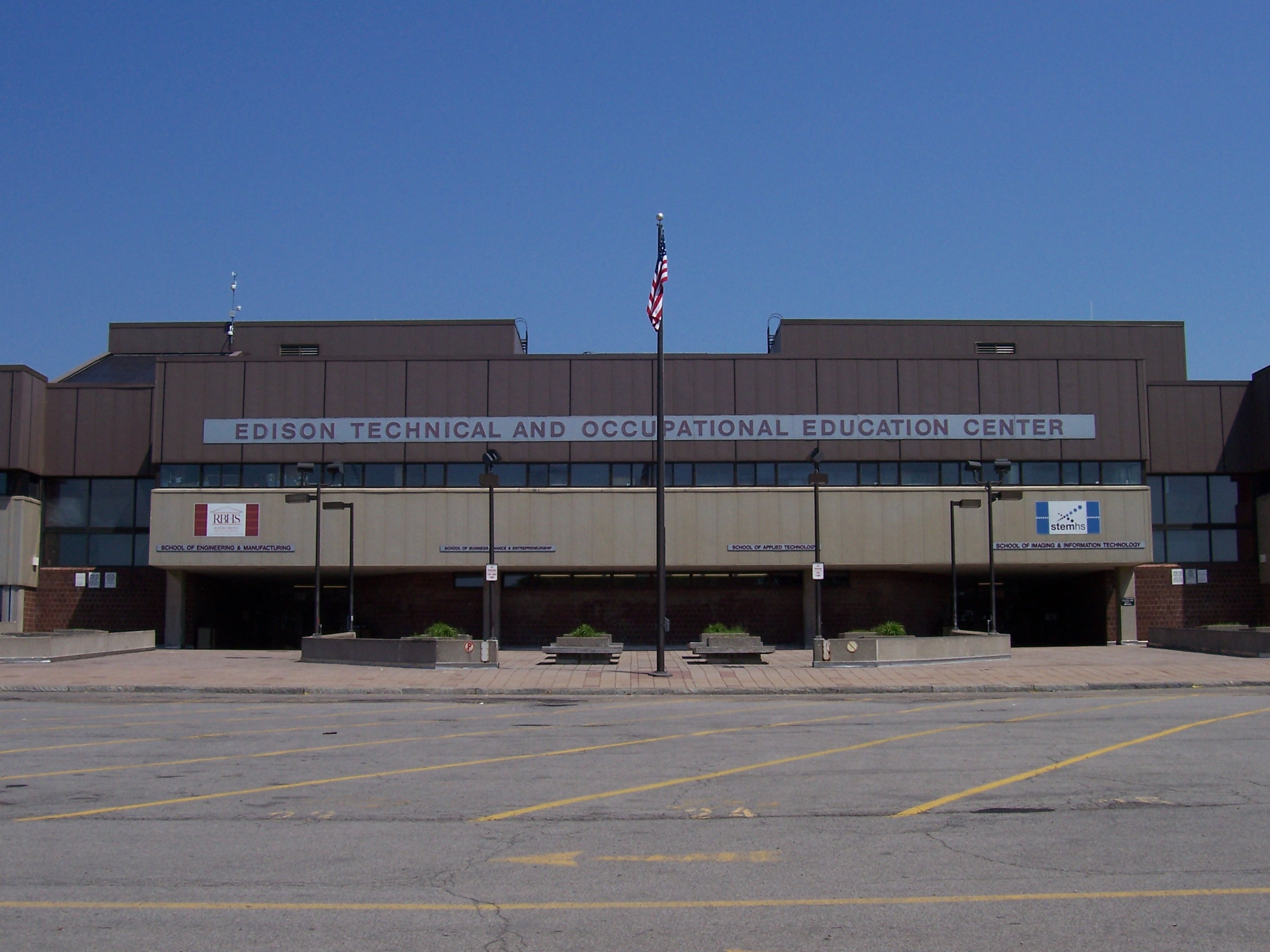
Edison

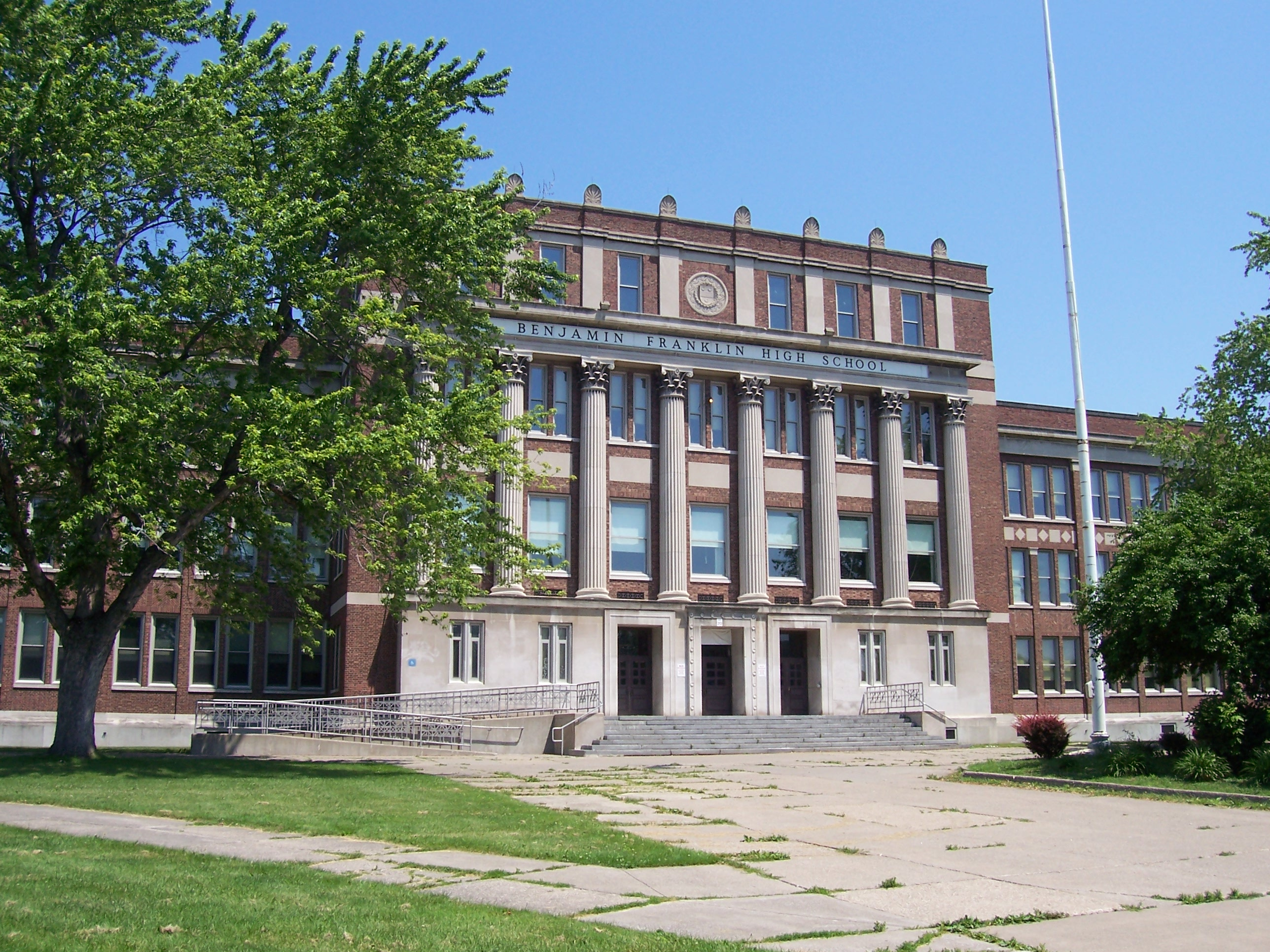
Franklin

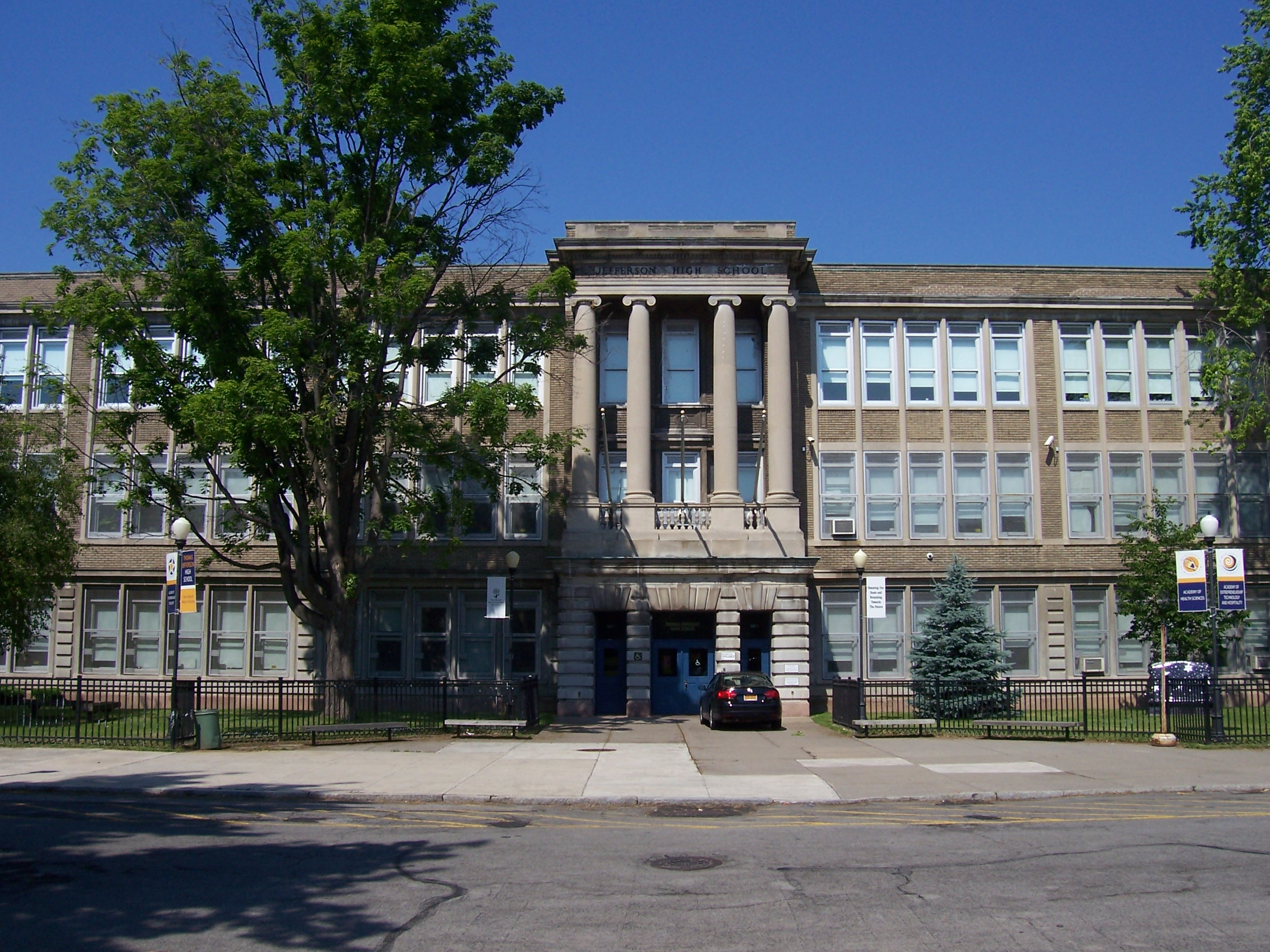
Jefferson

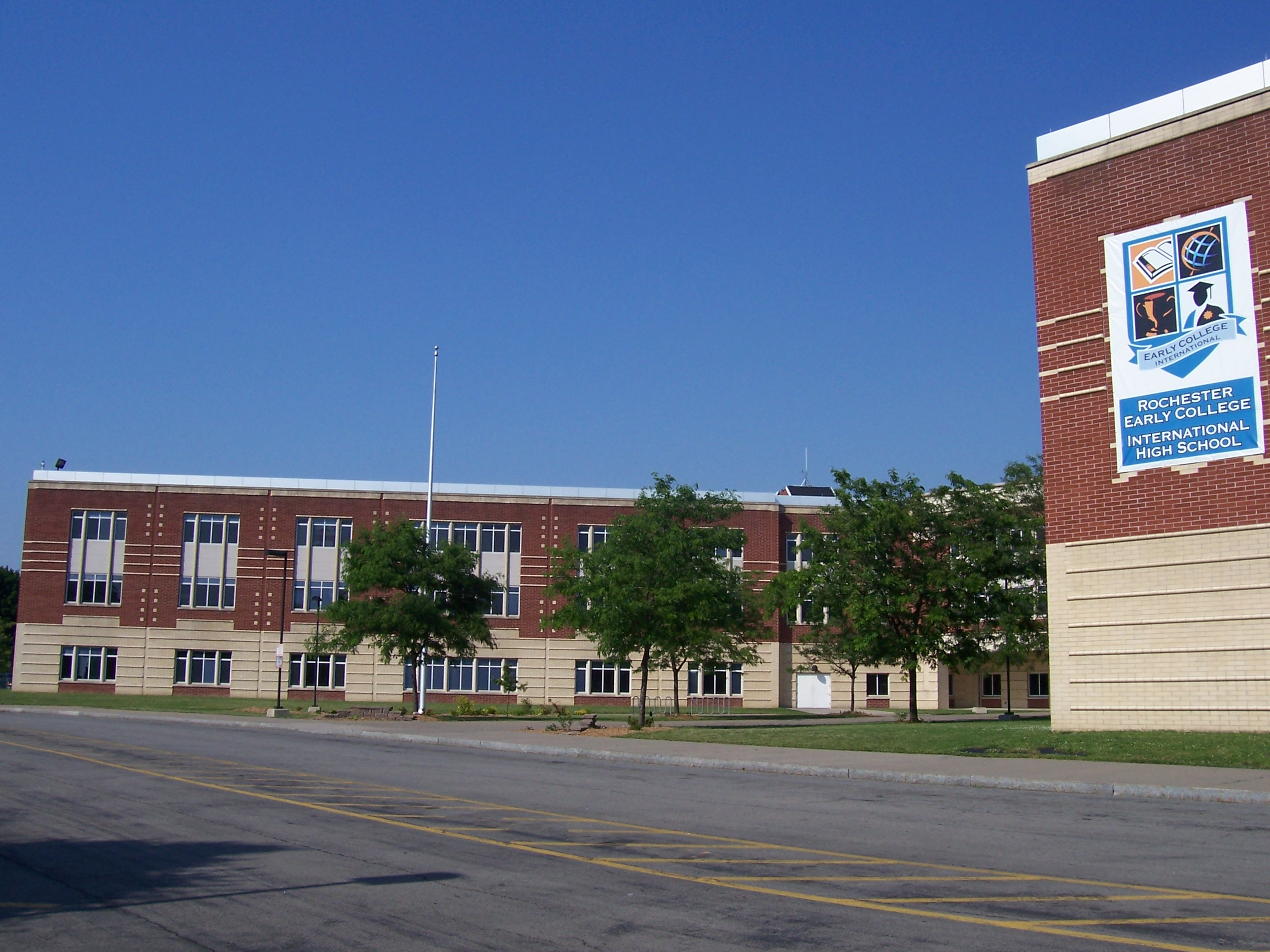
Madison

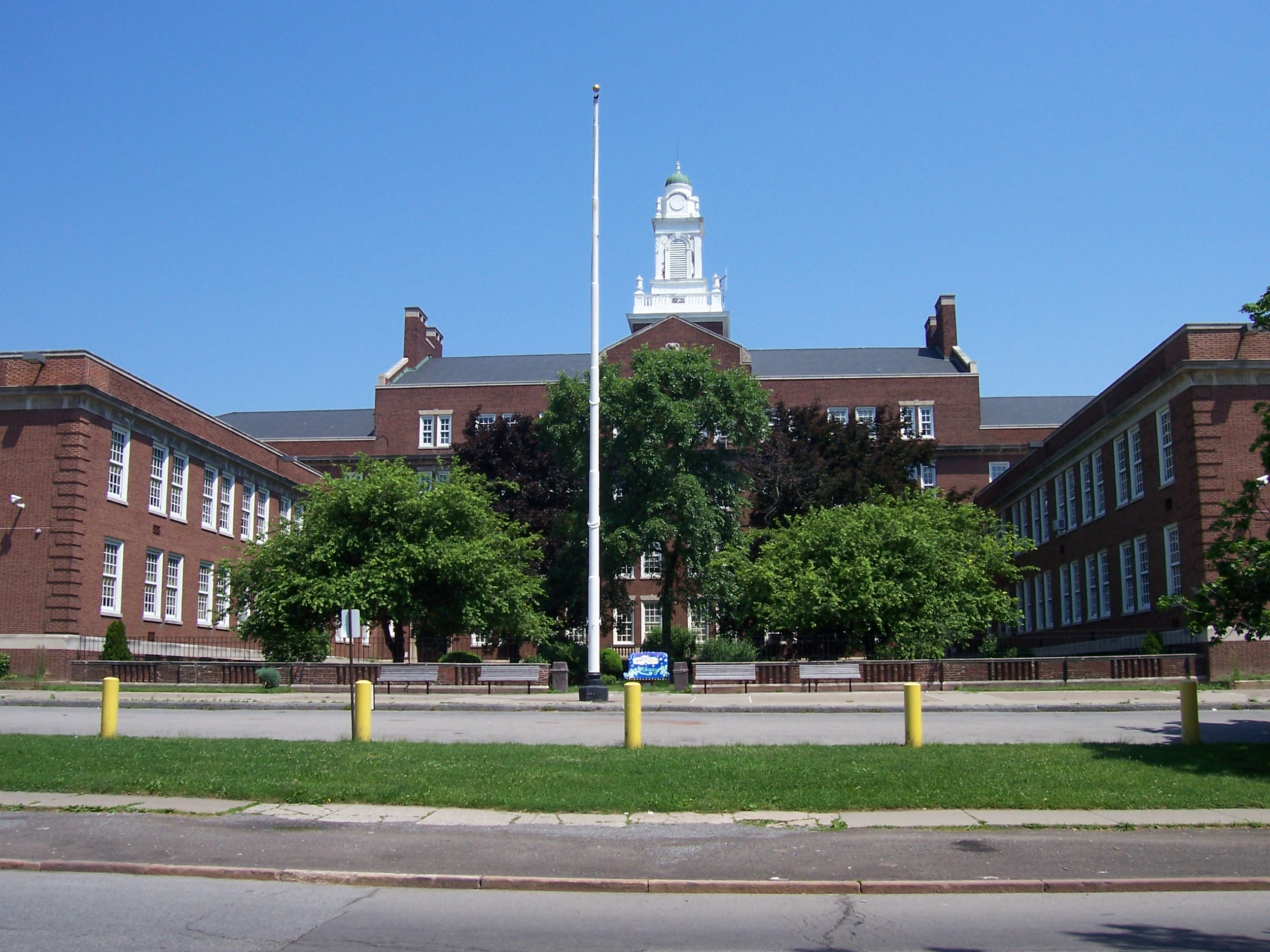
Marshall

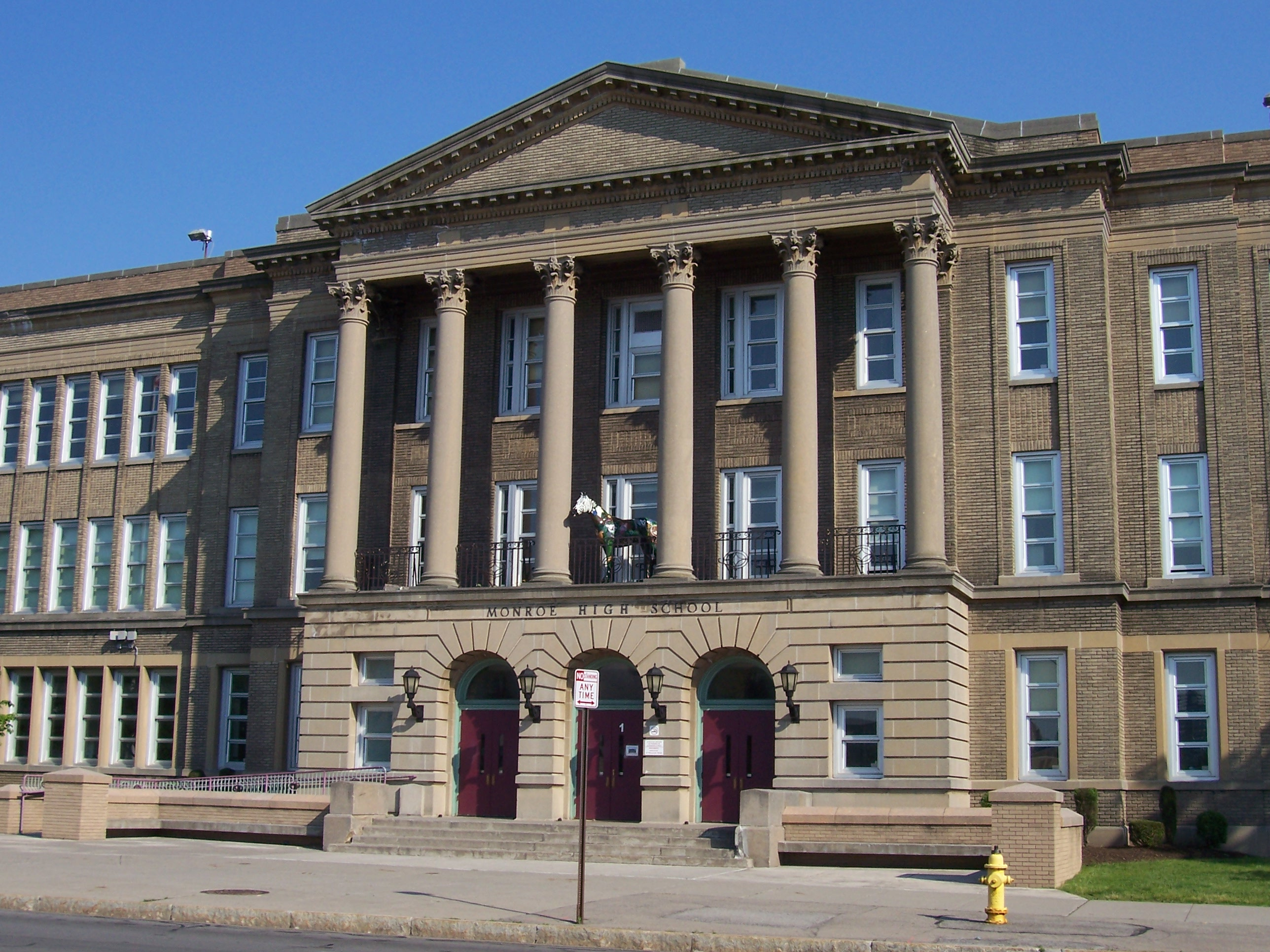
Monroe

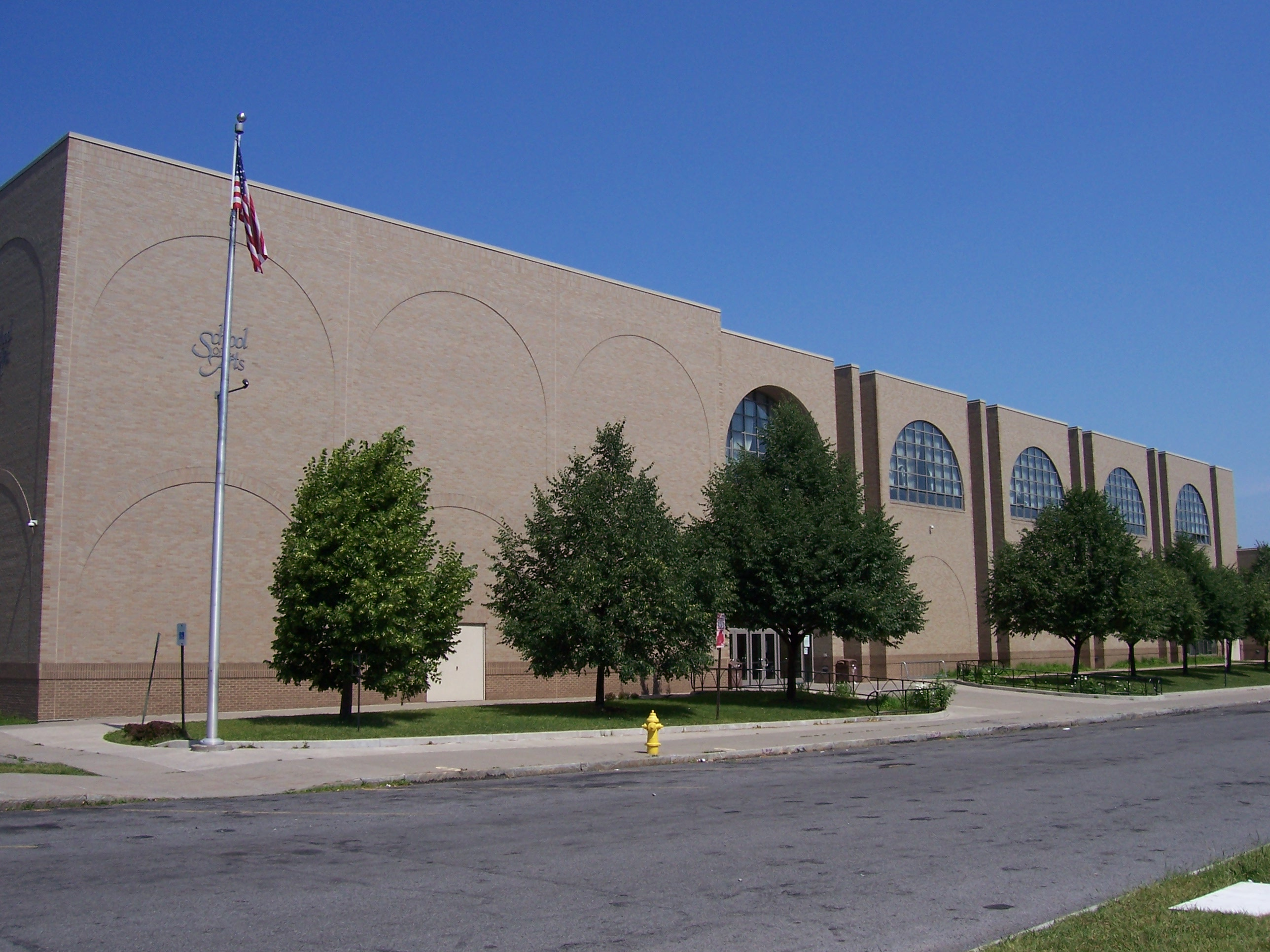
SOTA

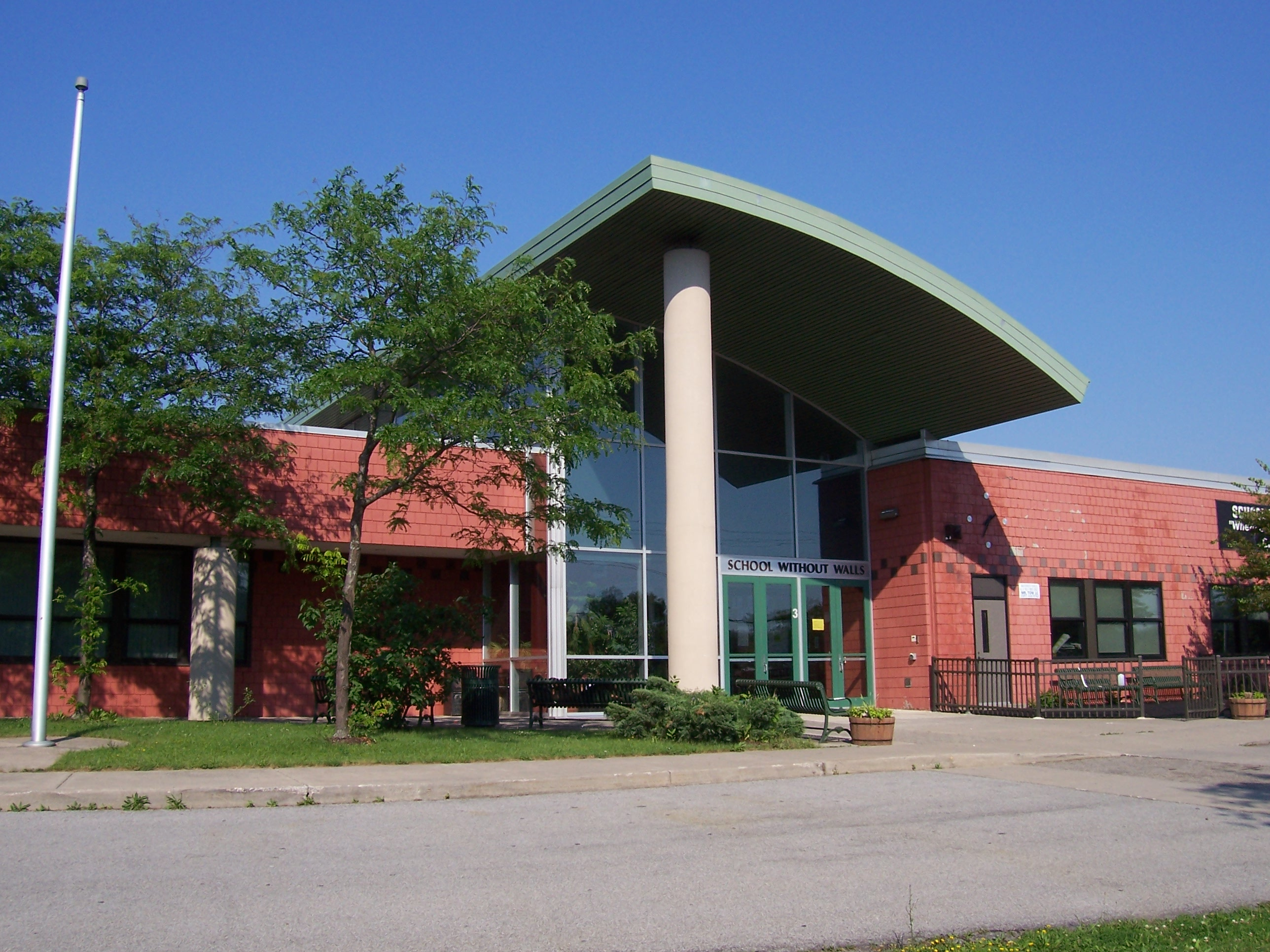
School Without Walls

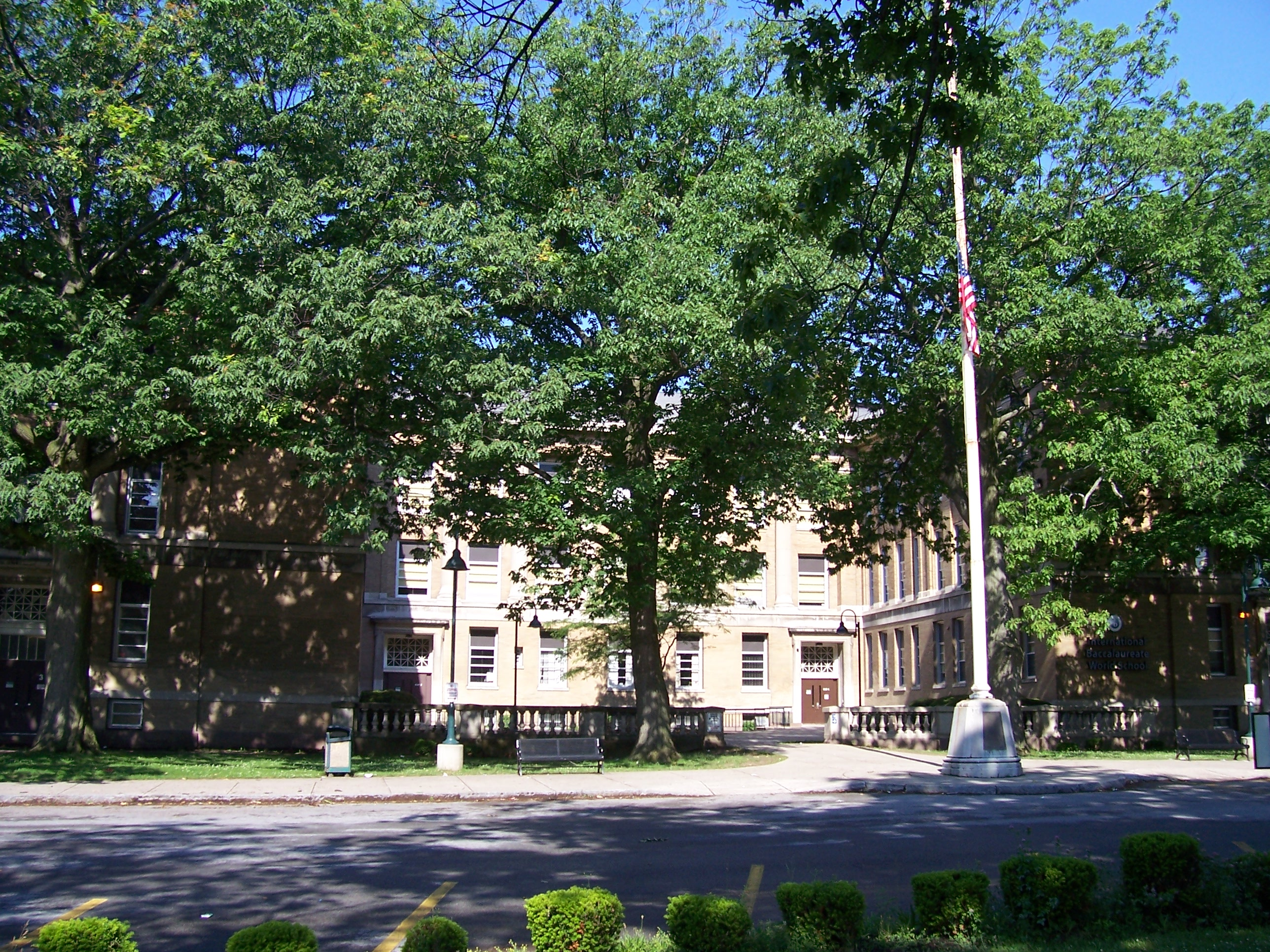
Wilson

== Performance ==
In 2019, the Rochester City School District was ranked the 3rd worst school district in upstate New York, and in 2017 it was ranked the 8th worst in New York State.

In 2007, the New York State Education Department named 14 Rochester elementary schools among the state's "most improved" schools in English language arts and/or math. Newsweek ranked Wilson Magnet High School 49th among the nation's top 100 high schools based on advanced curriculum.

The Children's Institute, a non-profit children's advocacy organization, has ranked the district's pre-K program one of the best in the nation.

== Configuration redesign ==
In 2003, a plan to redesign the grade-level configuration was approved by the board of education. It changed the district from one of elementary schools (preK–5), middle schools (6–8) and high schools (9–12) to one of elementary schools (pre-K–6) and secondary schools (7–12). The plan was implemented in stages over four years.

== Media coverage ==
Given the district's continued struggles there has been much local media coverage analyzing the district from varying perspectives, and most recently this has been done through the Democrat and Chronicle's Time to Educate Series. The motto of this media initiative is "Something. Must. Change." In 2018 the editorial board of that paper wrote "It is time to declare an emergency".
