= Charlotte High School (Rochester, New York) =

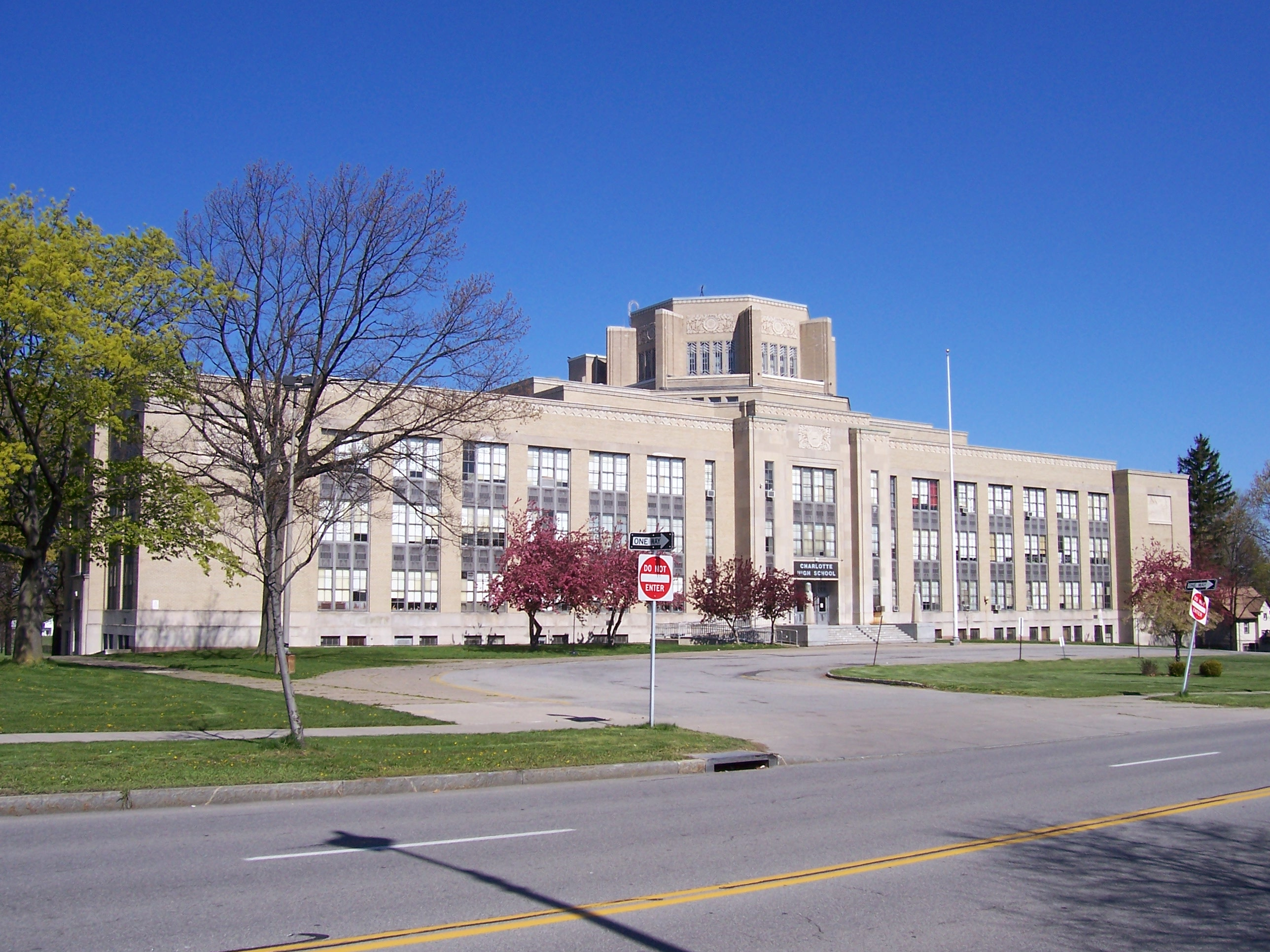
- Charlotte High School

Location
- 4115 Lake Avenue; Rochester, New York 14612; United States; 43°14′46″N 77°37′09″W

Information
- Type: Public high school
- Motto: Connecting Youth to Innovative Life Experiences
- Established: 1907; 119 years ago
- Status: Closed
- Closed: June 2016; 10 years ago
- School district: Rochester City School District
- Staff: ~100
- Faculty: 60
- Grades: 8–12
- Student to teacher ratio: 14:1
- Campus: Urban
- Colors: Green and white
- Nickname: Lakesiders
- Website: www.rcsdk12.org/lafym

Charlotte High School was a public high school in Rochester, operated by the Rochester City School District. The school is named for Charlotte, formerly an incorporated village in the Town of Greece and now a neighborhood in the city of Rochester. The school closed in June 2016.

== Demographics ==
- Hispanic 27%
- White 17.2%
- African American 53.9%
- Asian 1.1%
- Native American 0.8%

Charlotte High School's free/reduced lunch rate is 77.9% of the students.

== History ==
A school was built on the former site of a one-room school house in Charlotte in 1867. In 1907, a high school building was erected and the present Charlotte High School building was built in 1931. In 1988, the Rochester City School District changed Charlotte to a middle school. In 2005, it became a high school once again. The school closed in June 2016.

== Campus ==
Charlotte High School is housed in a five-story new art deco style building on Lake Avenue in Rochester, not far from Lake Ontario. The building contains a swimming pool that is open to the public when not used for school activities.

== Curriculum ==
In addition to typical high school courses, Charlotte High School offers some unique opportunities to students.

- Charlotte's Academy of Hospitality & Tourism includes internships and gives students an opportunity to explore and prepare for careers in travel, tourism, and hospitality.
- The school's Academy of Sports Medicine & Management includes internships with local athletic, medical and sports organizations, and helps prepare students for careers in athletic training, physical therapy, sports medicine, and sports management.
- To better serve the needs of the students, the school offers extended-day academic support and a Wellness Center offers counseling, social services, and after-school activities in partnership with community agencies.
- The school library houses a special collection on the Harlem Renaissance.

== Extracurriculars ==
=== Clubs and organizations ===
The school offers art, music, newspaper, math league and drama club.

Young video artists from Charlotte participate in the Rochester Urban Youth Film Festival, sponsored by the University of Rochester.

=== Sports ===
The school supports a full sports program.

The Lakesiders basketball team won successive New York State championships in 1983 and 1984. After winning the 2007 Section V Class "BB" title on March 3, 2007, the Charlotte basketball team finished second in the Far West Regional Class "B" final on March 10, 2007. The team repeated as Section V "BB"" champions on March 1, 2008.

On March 24, 1921, the wrestling team hosted city rival Edison Tech in what is believed to be the first interscholastic wrestling dual meet Western New York and beyond. In 1949, the Lakesider wrestlers went undefeated in dual meets (8 wins, 0 losses) and won the team title at the 3rd annual NYSPHSAA Section V Class A Wrestling Championships.

The 2009–2010 track team won the Section V Class B championship.

== Performance ==
In 2005, the school's attendance rate of 85% and its suspension rate of 33.3% both exceed those for similar schools. The school's standardized test scores for English Language Arts, Mathematics and Social Studies rank below the state average for similar schools.

== Incidents ==
In 2004, there were reports of violence and other acts at the school that required disciplinary action. Charlotte High School was on the New York State list of dangerous schools in 2006.

== See also ==
- Rochester City School District
