= Rochester and Lake Ontario Railroad =

Former railroad company in New York

Overview
- Parent company: Rochester, Lockport and Niagara Falls Railroad (1853); New York Central Railroad (1853–1855)
- Dates of operation: 1852–1855
- Successor: New York Central Railroad

Technical
- Track gauge: 1,435 mm (4 ft 8 1/2 in)
- Length: 6.88 miles (11.07 km)

The Rochester and Lake Ontario Railroad is a railway company in the United States. It was incorporated in 1852 and completed a line between Rochester, New York, and Charlotte, New York, on the southern shore of Lake Ontario, in 1853. It was leased by the Rochester, Lockport and Niagara Falls Railroad that same year and merged into the first New York Central Railroad in 1855. Its line, known variously as the Charlotte Branch or Charlotte Running Track, is now owned by the CSX Corporation and remains extant.

== History ==
The Rochester and Lake Ontario Railroad was incorporated on May 17, 1852. Its line, running 6.88 miles (11.07 km) (Note: The ICC figure of 7.43 miles (11.96 km) includes a later extension to Jay Street Junction and the Rochester Subdivision.) from a junction with the Rochester, Lockport and Niagara Falls Railroad in the vicinity of Rochester, New York to Charlotte, New York, opened in 1853.

The Rochester, Lockport and Niagara Falls Railroad leased the Rochester and Lake Ontario Railroad from the time that it started operating. The Rochester, Lockport and Niagara Falls was consolidated with nine other railroads to form the first New York Central Railroad on May 1, 1853. The new company assumed the lease until September 30, 1855, when it merged the company.

== Charlotte Branch ==
Under the New York Central Railroad and its successors the line was known as the Charlotte Branch. As part of the project that elevated the main line through Rochester in 1881–1883, the branch was extended south from the Falls Road to what is now the Rochester Subdivision. Following the Penn Central bankruptcy the line was conveyed to Conrail. Today, it belongs to the CSX Corporation.
