= Sibley–Elmdorf Historic District =

Historic district in New York, United States

- U.S. National Register of Historic Places
- U.S. Historic district
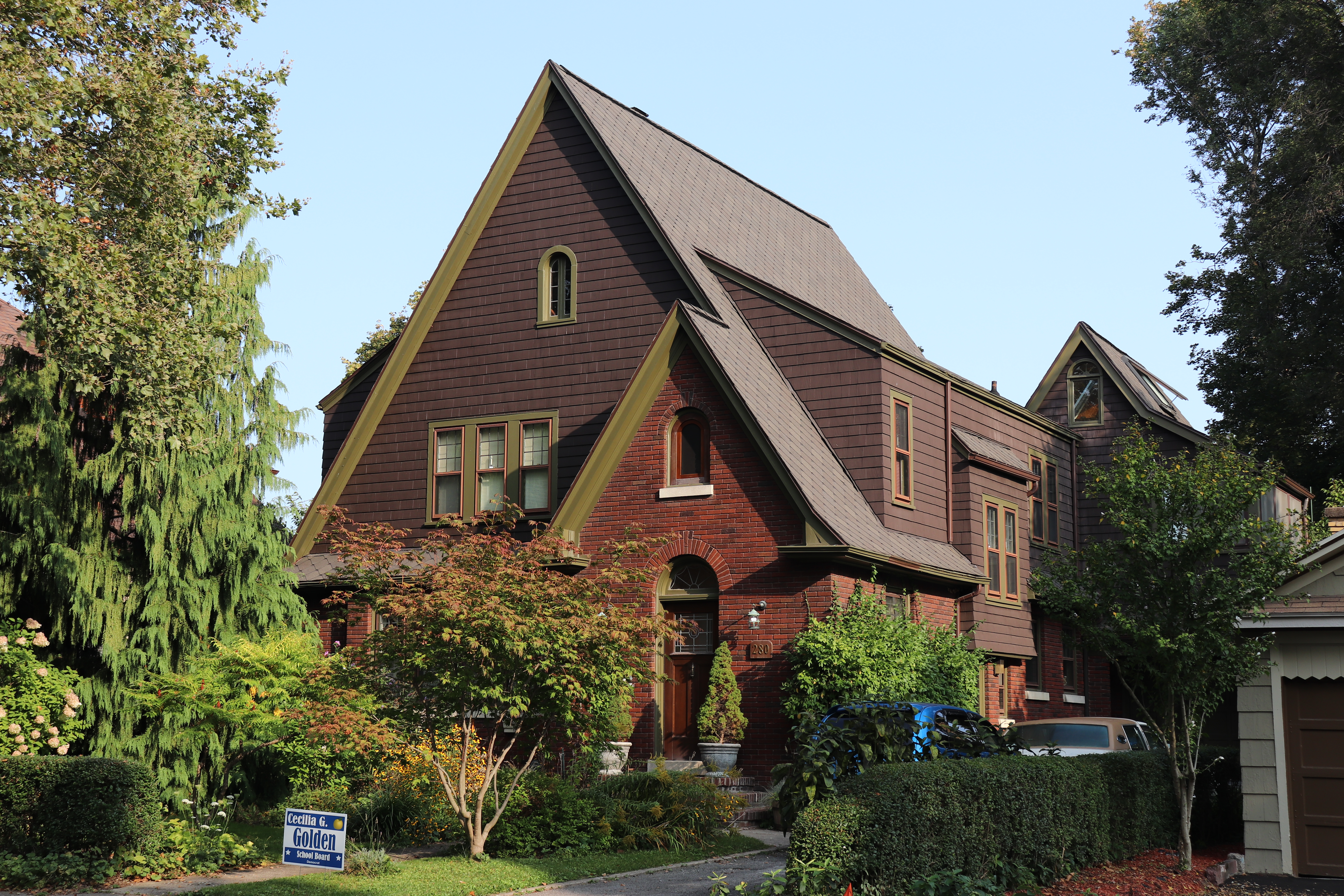
- 280 Melrose Street

- Location within New York Location within the United States
- Location: 23-405 Aberdeen, 20-324 Aldine, 447-551 Genesee, 157-320 Melrose, 187-325 Roslyn & 2-242 Trafalgar Sts., Rochester, New York
- Coordinates: 43°08′23″N 77°38′40″W
- Area: 107.14 acres (43.36 ha)
- Built: c. 1904-1963
- Architect: J. Foster Warner; Edwin Seamer Gordon; William Kaelber; D. J. Meagher; John Shea
- Architectural style: Classical Revival, Colonial Revival, Gothic Revival, Tudor Revival, Spanish Mission, American Foursquare, Bungalow/Craftsman
- NRHP reference No.: 15000557
- Added to NRHP: September 1, 2015

Sibley–Elmdorf Historic District is a national historic district located at Rochester, Monroe County, New York. The district encompasses 840 contributing buildings (486 primary buildings) and 1 contributing site in a predominantly residential section of Rochester. The district developed between about 1904 and 1963, and includes buildings in a variety of architectural styles including Classical Revival, Colonial Revival, Gothic Revival, Tudor Revival, Mission Revival, American Foursquare and Bungalow / American Craftsman. The dwellings reflect designs directed toward a middle-class clientele in a newly developing area of Rochester's Nineteenth Ward. Located in the district is the Westminster Presbyterian Church (now the New Life Fellowship Church, 1915), West High School (now known as the Joseph C. Wilson Magnet High School, 1905) by Rochester architect J. Foster Warner, Walter Spencer Public School #16 (c. 1911), and Aberdeen Square Park (c. 1915).

It was listed on the National Register of Historic Places in 2015.

== See also ==
- National Register of Historic Places listings in Rochester, New York
