= Rochester, Lockport and Niagara Falls Railroad =

Railroad company in New York

Overview
- Dates of operation: 1850–1853
- Predecessor: Lockport and Niagara Falls Railroad
- Successor: New York Central Railroad

Technical
- Track gauge: 1,435 mm (4 ft 8 1/2 in)
- Length: 75 miles (121 km)

The Rochester, Lockport and Niagara Falls Railroad was a railway company in the United States. It was incorporated in 1850 to acquire the bankrupt Lockport and Niagara Falls Railroad and develop a new route between its three namesake cities. This new line opened in 1852. The railroad was consolidated with nine other railroads in 1853 to form the first New York Central Railroad.

== History ==
The Lockport and Niagara Falls Railroad had been founded in 1834 and opened between Lockport, New York, and Niagara Falls, New York, in 1838. The New York legislature authorized the company to build east to Rochester, New York, but it lacked the financial resources to do so. The Rochester, Lockport and Niagara Falls Railroad was incorporated on December 14, 1850, to develop a new route between its namesake cities. It acquired the bankrupt Lockport and Niagara Falls Railroad at the same time. Trains stopped running on the original line on August 26, 1851, after which it was completely abandoned.

The new line, 75 miles (121 km) long, opened in July 1852. Compared to its predecessor it took a shorter, more direct route between Lockport and Niagara Falls, passing south of Pekin, New York, and the Tuscarora Reservation. In Rochester, New York, it connected with the Rochester and Syracuse Railroad. The Buffalo and Lockport Railroad, founded in 1852, soon provided a direct link between Lockport and Buffalo, New York.

The company leased the Rochester and Lake Ontario Railroad in early 1853; that company's line ran north from Rochester to Charlotte, on Lake Ontario. The Rochester, Lockport and Niagara Falls Railroad was consolidated with nine other railroads to form the first New York Central Railroad on May 1, 1853.
