= Buffalo and Lockport Railroad =

Former railroad company in New York

Overview
- Dates of operation: 1852–1853
- Successor: New York Central Railroad

Technical
- Track gauge: 1,435 mm (4 ft 8 1/2 in)
- Length: 22 miles (35 km)

The Buffalo and Lockport Railroad was a railway company in the United States. It was incorporated in 1852 and completed a line between Buffalo, New York, and Lockport, New York, in 1853. The railroad was consolidated with nine other railroads later that year to form the first New York Central Railroad.

== History ==
The Erie Canal opened in 1825. The community of Lockport, New York, grew up around a set of double locks built to traverse the Niagara Escarpment there. The Lockport and Niagara Falls Railroad, which connected Lockport with Niagara Falls, New York, opened in 1838. The Rochester, Lockport and Niagara Falls Railroad acquired that company in 1850, closed the original route in 1851, and opened a new line, including an eastward extension to Rochester, New York, in 1852. The Buffalo and Niagara Falls Railroad had completed a line between Buffalo, New York, and Niagara Falls in 1837.

The Buffalo and Lockport Railroad was incorporated on April 29, 1852, to build a connection from the Rochester, Lockport and Niagara Falls Railroad southwest to Buffalo. The 22-mile (35 km) line opened in February 1853. It met the Buffalo and Niagara Falls Railroad in Tonawanda, and the two companies agreed to develop a new joint right-of-way from there to Buffalo.

The Buffalo and Lockport Railroad was consolidated with nine other railroads to form the first New York Central Railroad on May 1, 1853. The New York Central leased the Buffalo and Niagara Falls on December 22, 1853. The New York Central completed the new route between Tonawanda and Buffalo on December 1, 1854, and subsequently abandoned the original route of the Buffalo and Niagara Falls.
