= Buffalo and Niagara Falls Railroad =

Railway company in New York

Overview
- Parent company: New York Central Railroad (1853–1869)
- Locale: Buffalo, NY to Niagara Falls, NY
- Dates of operation: 1834–1869
- Successor: New York Central Railroad

Technical
- Track gauge: 1,435 mm (4 ft 8 1/2 in)
- Length: 22 miles (35 km)

The Buffalo and Niagara Falls Railroad was a railway company in the United States. It was incorporated in 1834 and completed a line between Buffalo, New York, and Niagara Falls, New York, in 1837. It was leased by the first New York Central Railroad in 1853 and formally merged in 1869.

The company's original right-of-way has been abandoned. It developed a new right-of-way between Buffalo and Tonawanda, New York with the Buffalo and Lockport Railroad. Between Tonawanda and Niagara Falls, the New York Central abandoned the Buffalo and Niagara Falls route in favor of the Canandaigua and Niagara Falls Railroad. The combined route is today the Niagara Subdivision of CSX Transportation, and is still used for freight and Amtrak passenger service.

== History ==
The Buffalo and Niagara Falls Railroad was incorporated on May 3, 1834. The 22-mile (35 km) line between Buffalo, New York, and Niagara Falls, New York, opened for operation on May 1, 1837. Within Buffalo, it ran parallel to the Buffalo and Black Rock Railroad, a horsecar line which followed the Erie Canal to Black Rock. Also serving Niagara Falls was the Lockport and Niagara Falls Railroad, which began operation in early 1838. (Note: The exact date is unknown. Several sources report that the company probably began operating in 1838. Yates reprints a 1893 interview with Stephen Sult, former roadmaster of the Lockport and Niagara Falls Railroad, who recalled hauling freight during the Patriot War, which began in December 1837.)

The Buffalo and Lockport Railroad built from Lockport, New York, to Tonawanda, New York, where it met the Buffalo and Niagara Falls Railroad, in 1852. The two railroads agreed to jointly develop a new right-of-way between Tonawanda and Buffalo. The Buffalo and Lockport Railroad was consolidated with nine other railroads to form the first New York Central Railroad on May 1, 1853. The New York Central leased the Buffalo and Niagara Falls on December 22, 1853. The New York Central completed the new route between Tonawanda and Buffalo on December 1, 1854, and subsequently abandoned the original route of the Buffalo and Niagara Falls between those two cities.

The Canandaigua and Niagara Falls Railroad was opened between Canandaigua, New York, and Niagara Falls on July 1, 1853. This was a broad gauge line, associated with the New York and Erie Railroad. The Canandaigua and Niagara Falls line ran parallel to the Buffalo and Niagara Falls between Towananda and Niagara Falls. The New York Central leased the Niagara Bridge and Canandaigua Railroad, successor to the Canandaigua and Niagara Falls, in 1858. Under the New York Central that line was re-gauged to standard gauge and the parallel Buffalo and Niagara Falls abandoned. The company was formally merged on April 23, 1869, shortly before the formation of the New York Central and Hudson River Railroad.

== See also ==
- New York Central Niagara River Railroad, a short branch north of Black Rock
