= School Without Walls (Rochester, New York) =

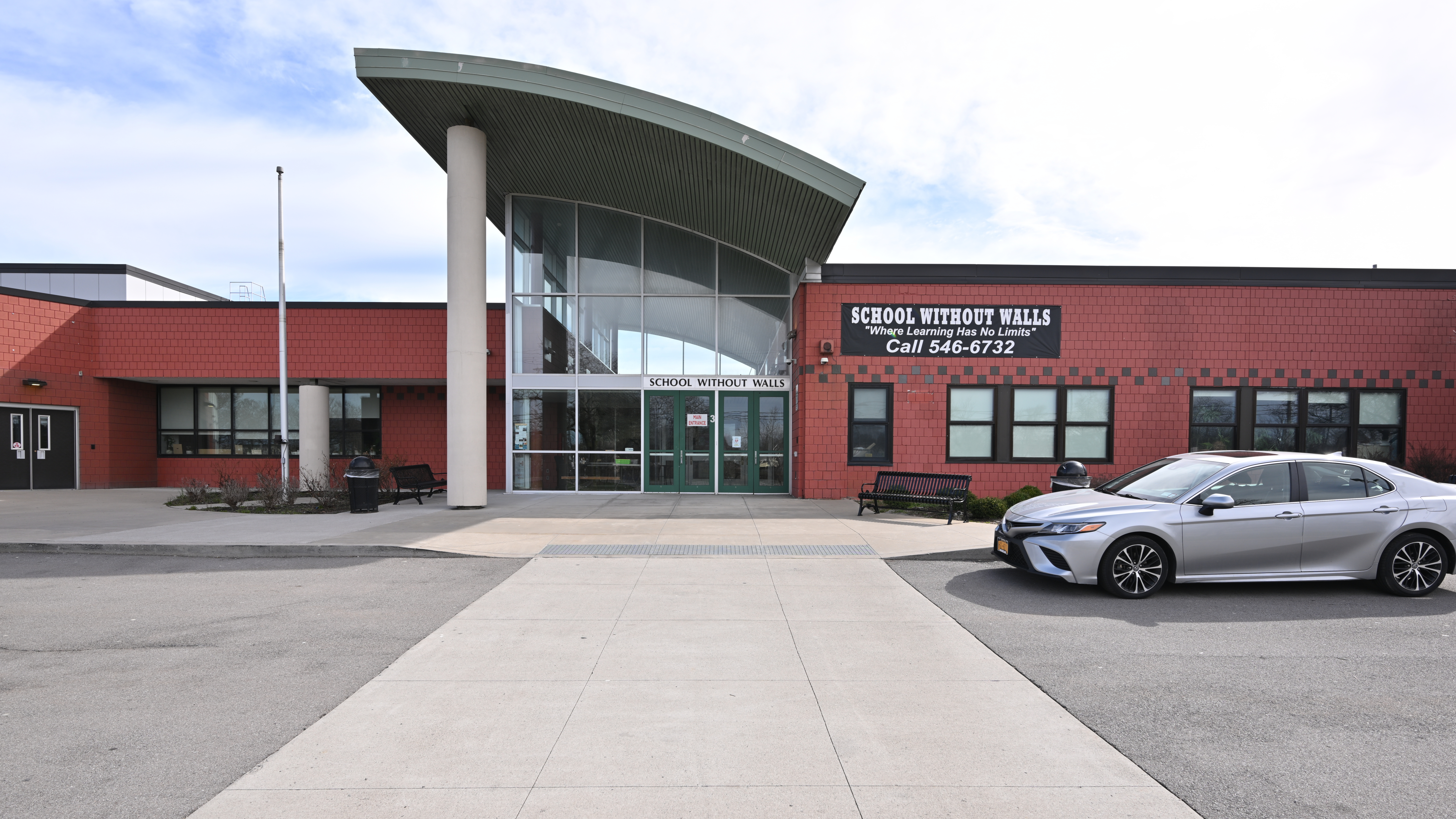

Location
- 480 Broadway; Rochester, New York; US; 43°8′51.6″N 77°36′0.6″W

Information
- Type: Public high school
- Motto: Where Learning Has No Limits
- Established: 1971
- School district: Rochester City School District
- Principal: Idonia Owens
- Teaching staff: 28.77 (FTE)
- Grades: 9-12
- Enrollment: 260 (2023–2024)
- Student to teacher ratio: 9.04
- Colors: Black and white
- Website: https://www.rcsdk12.org/schooldirectory/high-school/school-without-walls

School Without Walls, located in Rochester, New York, United States, is a high school for students in grades 9-12, and is an example of an alternative school.

== Demographics ==
- Hispanic 16.5%
- White 24.3%
- African American 57.0%
- Asian 1.5%
- Native American 0.8%

The free/reduced lunch rate is 68% of students.

== History ==
In 1968, students at Monroe High School presented an idea to the principal for an alternative education program. In October 1969, teachers began helping students attain their goal. Parents, teachers and students soon joined forces. Led by Lew Marks (1932-2010), an English teacher at the school, they presented a proposal for the School Without Walls to the District Superintendent in January 1971. On February 4, 1971, the Board of Education approved the proposal that created the School Without Walls, which opened in September 1971 at 4 Elton Street, sharing space with the Visual Studies Workshop at the time.

Subsequent locations included the 5th floor of the building at 50 West Main Street, and a floor of the building at 400 Andrews Street, both in Rochester. School Without Walls moved to its present building, the former Sears Automotive building located near Monroe High School, in 1987. The middle school was closed in 2013.

== Notable alumni ==
- Branden Albert
- Nicholson Baker
- Jim Hilgartner
- Joy Ladin

== See also ==
- Rochester City School District
