= Charlotte, Rochester, New York =

Neighborhood in Rochester, New York, U.S.

Coordinates: 43°15′30″N 77°36′31″W

Charlotte Beach and Pier at the mouth of the Genesee River, looking northeast

Charlotte (/ʃɑːrˈlɒt/ shar-LOT) is a neighborhood in Rochester, in the U.S. state of New York, located along the western bank of the mouth of the Genesee River along the southern shore of Lake Ontario. It is the home of the Port of Rochester and Charlotte High School.

== History ==
=== Early settlers ===
In 1788, the Mill Yard Tract, a parcel of land approximately 12 miles (19 km) wide and 24 miles (39 km) long, along bank of the Genesee River stretching from present day locations of Charlotte at Lake Ontario through the City of Rochester was purchased from the Seneca Indians by Oliver Phelps and Nathaniel Gorham. During this time, the area between the river and Braddock Bay was still used as hunting grounds by the Seneca Indians. The first hut on the shores of Lake Ontario on the west side of the Genesee River was constructed in 1791 by William Hincher and his son who settled the land the next season with his wife and seven daughters. These early settlements preceded the later permanent settlements at the village of Rochester. In 1792 the Pulteney Association purchased rights to much of Phelps and Gorham's land in New York. Colonel Robert Troup, an agent of the Pulteney Association, arranged the first layout of the town, dividing the land into 1-acre (0.40 ha) lots. He named the area "Charlottesburgh" in honor of his daughter.

=== Lake trade ===
The community once served as a port for international trade. Samuel Latta established a warehouse at the mouth of the Genesee River and in 1806 was appointed as customs collector of the Port of Genesee by President Thomas Jefferson. Samuel Latta's brother, frontier merchant George Clinton Latta (1795–1871) ran a successful trading company from Charlotte, operating a fleet of schooners engaging in trade across the Great Lakes.

Trade was interrupted during the War of 1812 and a less exposed port was briefly established three miles upstream at Carthage Landing. During the course of the war, British forces were encountered at Charlotte on several occasions. In June 1813, the British fleet under Sir James Yeo landed at Charlotte and confiscated supplies of grain, flour, pork and other stores which the residents surrendered without further incident. In September of that year, the British fleet was again spotted off shore, but was engaged and driven off by the American fleet of Commodore Isaac Chauncey. Finally, in May 1814, the British attempted another landing, however, this time the citizens who had become aware of the British and Indian massacre at Lewiston and the recent attack at Oswego, dispatched the local militia to refuse landing. After a brief exchange of cannon fire, the fleet departed. In 1816, Colonel Caleb Hopkins was commissioned as brigadier general for gallant service during the war, including defending the Port of Charlotte against the British.

After the end of the war, trade began to rapidly increase. Some early settlers believed that Charlotte would become the major city along the Genesee River, until the use of the water falls to provide power to the mills and the arrival of the Erie Canal in 1823 later resulted in the dominance of the settlements at the City of Rochester.

For a few years, a "little side-wheel steamer" named "Ontario", which served from north of the Niagara Falls to Prescott, Ontario, included a stop near Charlotte on the Genesee River. The steamer was launched in April, 1817, and had a capacity of 240 tons.

In order to improve navigation, a stone light house was constructed in 1821 on the west bank, replaced later in 1880 by an Octagonal light on the west pier.

From roughly 1840 to 1844, a steamship "Gore" carried passengers, plus "luggage, parcels, and packages", between stops at: Rochester, N.Y., Cobourg, Ontario, and Port Hope.

On August 25, 1852, ground was broken on the Rochester and Lake Ontario Railroad (later part of the New York Central Railroad) which made its first run on May 12, 1853, in about thirty minutes. The railroad provided a convenient route for Canadian passages to reach New York City.

However, lake trade from Charlotte began to decline from increased competition from the Erie Canal and the railroad lines in Rochester.

=== Resort era ===
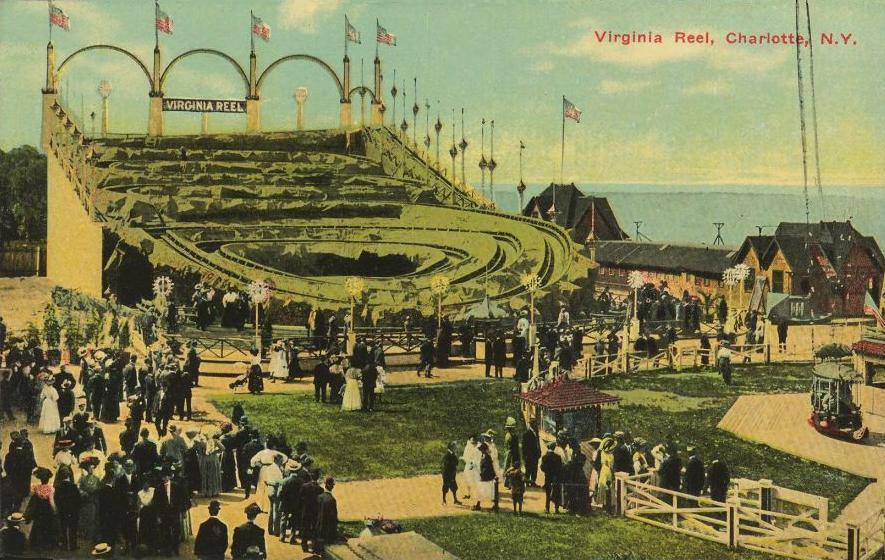
Virginia Reel roller coaster at Ontario Beach Amusement Park, Charlotte, Rochester, New York c. 1910

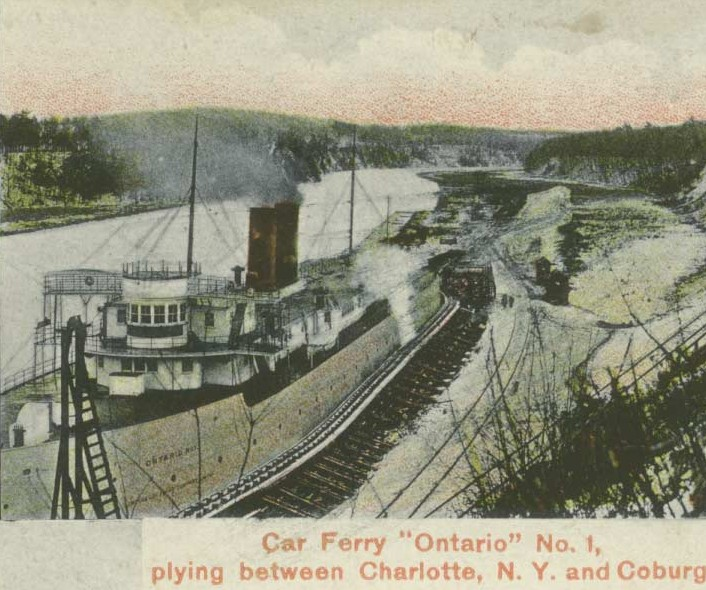
Ontario I docked at Charlotte c. 1907

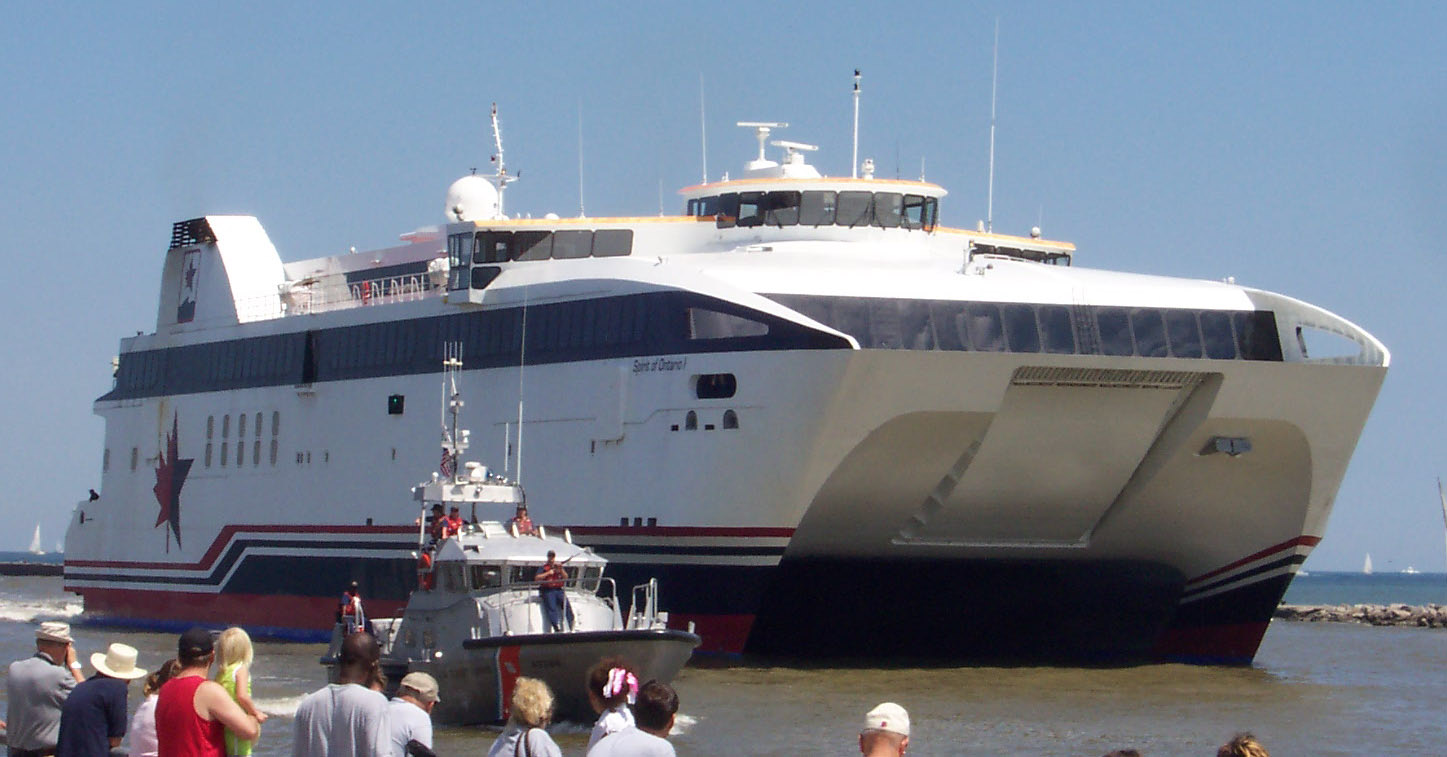
Spirit of Ontario I fast ferry arriving in Charlotte 2004

After the Civil War, Charlotte rebounded as a summer resort with the arrival of several excursion steamers and with organization of the Genesee Yacht Club in 1874. The Ontario Car Ferry Company began operating a ferry service for passengers and cargo from the port in November 1907 with the launch of the "Ontario I" later joined by the "Ontario II" as well as the "Toronto" and the "Kingston". These large ferries prompted a need to deepen the channel and make harbour improvements.

In 1884, the Ontario Beach Improvement Company was formed to establish lake front resort area and by 1889 electric trolleys were connecting vacationers to the City of Rochester.

Charlotte was annexed by the city of Rochester in 1916 in an effort by the city to gain control over the port and increase its population, thereby raising its political importance and funding. The port's activity again declined during the Great Depression. Ferry traffic eventual came to an end around 1949.

Another attempt to establish ferry traffic between Rochester and Toronto was made with the launch of a fast ferry the Spirit of Ontario I which ran from 2004 to 2005. The fast ferry again spurred a round of investment in Charlotte and the port.

== Parks and attractions ==
- Ontario Beach Park
- Charlotte Genesee Lighthouse
