= Edison Technical School =

Public High School in Rochester, New York

Edison Career and Technology High School
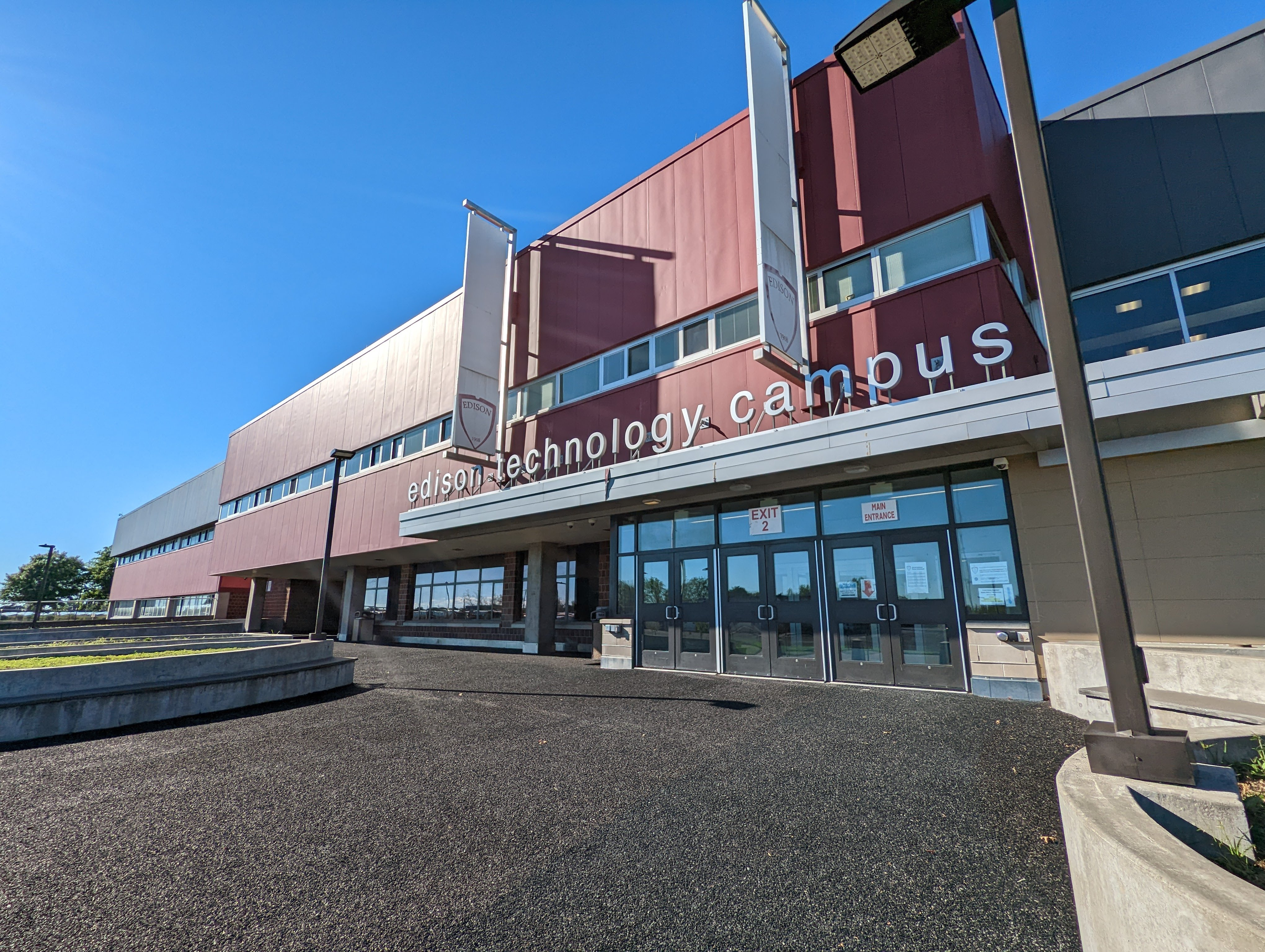
- Front entrance of Edison Career and Technology High School

Location
- 655 Colfax St; Rochester, New York 14606; United States; 43°10′41″N 77°40′12″W

Information
- Type: Public
- Motto: Invent Your Future
- School district: Rochester City School District
- NCES School ID: 362475006216
- Principal: Anthony Rodriguez
- Teaching staff: 145.25 (on an FTE basis)
- Grades: 9-12
- Enrollment: 1,161 (2023-2024)
- Student to teacher ratio: 7.99
- Campus: City: Midsize
- Colors: Maroon, Silver and Black
- Mascot: Inventors
- Yearbook: Edisonian
- Website: edison.rcsdk12.org

The Edison Career and Technology High School (also known as the Rochester Factory School, the Rochester Shop School and the Thomas Alva Edison Technical and Industrial High School) is a public high school in Rochester, New York, part of the Rochester City School District. It was founded in 1908, and in the 1990s was converted to the Edison Technical Education Center, housing a group of Career and Technical Education programs which have been established, abolished and combined in various ways.

The school teams are known as the Edison Inventors.

== History ==
The Rochester Factory School was established in 1908. In 1911 it was moved to a building in Exposition Park (which had formerly housed the Western House of Refuge, a reform school) owned by the district, and around 1913 the name was changed to the Rochester Shop School. It was moved to a different building in the park in 1917, and in 1918 to another building at Joseph Avenue and Avenue D. In 1926 it was moved again, to several floors of a building on the grounds of the Bausch & Lomb Optical Company plant. In 1931, the name was changed to the Thomas Alva Edison Technical and Industrial High School, and soon shortened to Edison Technical School.

In the fall of 1940, Edison Tech moved yet again into the former Washington High School on Clifford Avenue, now with 1400 students. The former students and staff of Washington High were relocated to Benjamin Franklin High School. This included 1300 pupils and 47 teachers. Finally, Edison Tech moved into its current location at 655 Colfax St. in the fall of 1979.

In the 1990s Edison Tech was converted to the Edison Technical Occupational Education Center, housing a group of CTE programs which would subsequently be established, abolished and combined in various ways. Students share the same site and operate a single combined sports program, which still uses the Edison Tech name; the community perceives that the students go to "Edison Tech". As of 2013, reports from a state agency concluded that the new schools were failing to meet the needs of 21st-century employers, and offered a number of possible solutions, none of which involved re-establishing the traditional Edison Tech.

== Notable projects ==
In May 2024, Principal LaCassa Felton announced that Edison would be creating a "Women's Memorial Hall" to honor women who served in industrial and technical fields. They announced their first mural "The Black Rosies" in honor of African American women who worked in factories when many men left to fight in World War II. In 2025, students at Edison chose to create a mosaic honoring former first lady Michelle Obama. In 2026, the students at Edison created a mosaic of Supreme Court Justice Sonia Sotomayor.

== Notable alumni ==
- Rudy Boesch - (Left school and joined US Navy in 1945) Two-time Survivor Contestant and Navy Seal
- Maia Chaka - (Class of 2000) First Black Female on-field referee in the NFL
- Bill Cox - (Rochester Shop School) Entrant 1924 Olympics and later a Teacher at ETHS Clifford Avenue Campus
- Dyaisha Fair - (Class of 2019) 2024 WNBA Draft Pick
- Bettina Love - (Class of 1997) Author and Professor of Education
