= Canandaigua and Niagara Falls Railroad =

Overview
- Dates of operation: 1851–1858
- Successor: Niagara Bridge and Canandaigua Railroad

Technical
- Track gauge: 6 ft (1,829 mm)
- Length: 99 miles (159 km)

The Canandaigua and Niagara Falls Railroad was a railway company in the United States. It was incorporated in 1851 and completed a line between Canandaigua, New York, and Niagara Falls, New York, in 1854. The company was reorganized as the Niagara Bridge and Canandaigua Railroad, a forerunner of the New York Central and Hudson River Railroad, in 1858.

== History ==
The Canandaigua and Niagara Falls Railroad was incorporated on March 18, 1851. The railroad was loosely associated with the New York and Erie and the Canandaigua and Elmira Railroads, which between them owned a broad gauge line between Canandaigua, New York, and New York City. The new railroad was to build a broad gauge line west from Canandaigua to Niagara Falls, New York.

The company opened its initial line between Canandaigua and Batavia, New York, a distance of 50 miles (80 km), on January 1, 1853. The line was further extended west to Niagara Falls on July 1, 1853. Between North Tonawanda, New York, and Niagara Falls, the line ran roughly parallel to the standard-gauge Buffalo and Niagara Falls Railroad. A further extension to the vicinity of the Niagara Falls Suspension Bridge opened in 1854. (Note: Sources disagree on the date. Flint gives 1854, without qualification. McIntosh gives April 1, 1854. The History of Niagara County, N.Y., published in 1878, gives October 1, 1854. These all contradict the 1930 valuation report by the Interstate Commerce Commission, which placed the western terminus of the railroad in North Tonawanda.)

The company experienced financial difficulties and entered receivership in 1855. The property was sold in 1857, and reorganized as the Niagara Bridge and Canandaigua Railroad on August 28, 1858, and subsequently leased by the New York Central Railroad. Under the New York Central the line was re-gauged to standard gauge and the parallel Buffalo and Niagara Falls abandoned. The Niagara Bridge and Canandaigua Railroad continued to exist on paper until it was merged into the New York Central and Hudson River Railroad, successor to the first New York Central Railroad, on January 10, 1890.
