= Lockport and Niagara Falls Railroad =

Overview
- Dates of operation: 1834–1850
- Successor: Rochester, Lockport and Niagara Falls Railroad

Technical
- Track gauge: 1,435 mm (4 ft 8 1/2 in)
- Length: 23 miles (37 km)

The Lockport and Niagara Falls Railroad was a railway company in the United States. It was incorporated in 1834 and completed a line between Lockport and Niagara Falls, New York, in 1838. The Rochester, Lockport and Niagara Falls Railroad, a predecessor of the first New York Central Railroad, acquired the company in 1850 and relocated its line further south, abandoning the original route in its entirety.

== History ==
The impetus for the Lockport and Niagara Falls Railroad came from two businessmen in Lockport, New York: Asher Torrance and Washington Hunt (a future governor of the state). Lockport lay on the Erie Canal, which carried substantial traffic to Buffalo, New York. Niagara Falls, already a major attraction, lay due west from Lockport. A railroad running overland between Lockport and Niagara Falls, New York, could capture some of the Buffalo traffic.

The company was incorporated on April 24, 1834. Construction of the new railroad began in 1835. Operation began during 1838, initially with horse-drawn cars. (Note: The exact date is unknown. Several sources report that the company probably began operating in 1838. Yates reprints a 1893 interview with Stephen Sult, former roadmaster of the Lockport and Niagara Falls Railroad, who recalled hauling freight during the Patriot War, which began in December 1837.) In total, the company's line ran 23 miles (37 km) from Lockport to Niagara Falls via Pekin, New York, and the Tuscarora Reservation. At the western end of the Tuscarora Reservation the line connected with the Lewiston Railroad, a horse-drawn railway which ran 3 miles (4.8 km) west to Lewiston, New York. In 1845, a typical journey between Lockport and Niagara Falls required 1 hour and 30 minutes.

The state authorized the railroad to extend either east to Rochester, New York, or southeast to Batavia, New York, where connection would be available with the Auburn and Rochester Railroad or Tonawanda Railroad, respectively. Such an extension proved beyond the company's limited resources. The Rochester, Lockport and Niagara Falls Railroad was incorporated on December 14, 1850, to develop a new railroad between the namesake cities, and acquired the bankrupt Lockport and Niagara Falls Railroad at the same time. Trains stopped running on the original line on August 26, 1851, after which it was completely abandoned.
