= List of New York railroads =

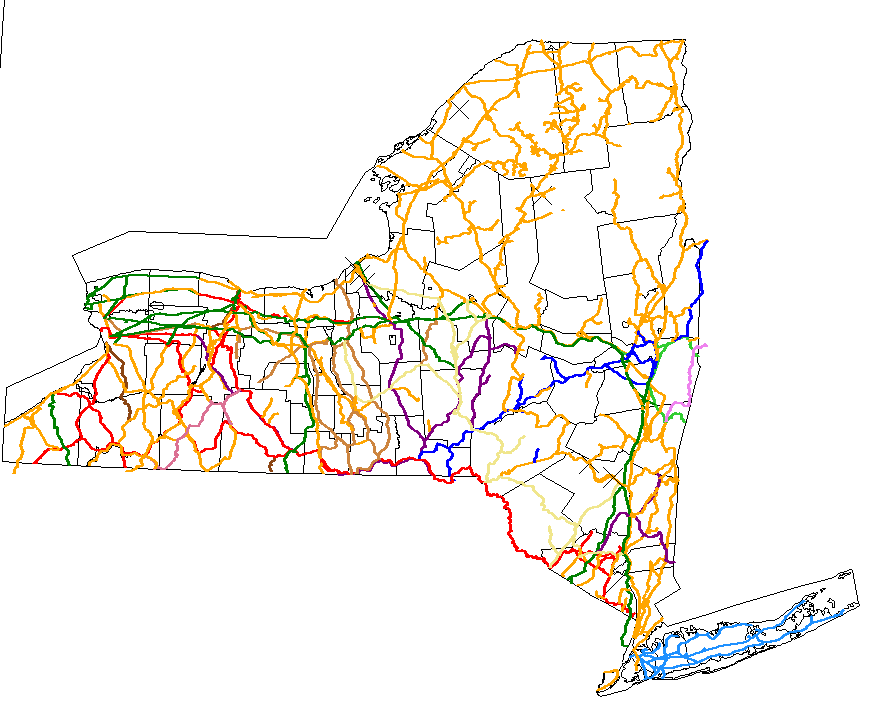
Current and former railroads in New York state

The following railroads currently or formerly operated in the U.S. state of New York.

== Common freight carriers ==
- Albany Port Railroad (APD) (Port of Albany)
- Arcade and Attica Railroad (ARA)
- B&H Rail Corporation (BH) (Owned by Livonia, Avon and Lakeville Railroad)
- Berkshire and Eastern Railroad (B&E) operated by Genesee & Wyoming on tracks owned by Pan Am Southern (PAS) after CSX and Norfolk Southern acquired it in 2022.
- Buffalo Southern Railroad (BSOR)
- Canadian National Railway (CN)
- Canadian Pacific Kansas City (CPKC) including Canadian Pacific (CPR) and subsidiary Delaware and Hudson Railway (DH)
- Central New York Railroad (CNYK) (operated by New York, Susquehanna and Western Railway)
- Clarendon and Pittsford Railroad (CLP) (owned by Vermont Railway)
- Conrail Shared Assets Operations (CSAO) (jointly owned by CSX Transportation and Norfolk Southern Railway, it operates the western portion of the North Shore Branch of the Staten Island Railroad (SIR)
- CSX Transportation (CSXT)
- Depew, Lancaster and Western Railroad (DLWR) (Genesee Valley Transportation)
- Falls Road Railroad (FRR) (Genesee Valley Transportation)
- Finger Lakes Railway (FGLK)
- Frontier Rail (FRRX)
- Housatonic Railroad (HRRC)
- Ithaca Central Railroad (ITHR) (Watco Companies)
- Livonia, Avon and Lakeville Railroad (LAL)
- Massena Terminal Railroad (MSTR) (Genesee and Wyoming Railroad)
- Middletown and New Jersey Railroad (MNJ) (Regional Rail)
- Mohawk, Adirondack and Northern Railroad (MHWA) (Genesee Valley Transportation)
- New York and Atlantic Railway (NYA) (Anacostia Rail Holdings)
- New York and Lake Erie Railroad (NYLE)
- New York New Jersey Rail, LLC (NYNJ)
- New York and Ogdensburg Railway (NYOG) (Owned by Vermont Railway)
- New York, Susquehanna and Western Railway (NYSW)
- Norfolk Southern Railway (NS)
- Ontario Central Railroad (ONCT) (Operated by Finger Lakes Railway)
- Ontario Midland Railroad (OMID)
- Owego and Harford Railway (OHRY)
- Providence and Worcester Railroad (PW) (Genesee and Wyoming)
- Rochester and Southern Railroad (RSR) (Genesee and Wyoming)
- SMS Rail Lines of New York (SNY) (Owned by SMS Rail Lines)
- Somerset Railroad (SOM) (Operated by CSX Transportation)
- South Buffalo Railway (SB)
- Vermont Railway (VTR)
- Wellsboro and Corning Railroad (WCOR) (Genesee and Wyoming)
- Western New York and Pennsylvania Railroad (WNYP) (Owned by Livonia, Avon and Lakeville Railroad)

== Private carriers ==
- Kodak Park Railroad (Operated by Rochester Switching Services)
- Port Liberty New York ExpressRail
- South Brooklyn Railway (SBK) (owned by NYC Transit and is only used for delivery of new subway rolling stock)

== Passenger carriers ==
- Amtrak (AMTK) (high-speed rail, intercity rail, and long-distance rail)

=== Commuter rail ===
- Long Island Rail Road (LI) (commuter rail)
- Metro-North Railroad (MNCW) (commuter rail)
- New Jersey Transit Rail Operations (NJTR) (commuter rail)

=== Rapid transit ===
- AirTrain JFK (people mover)
- Buffalo Metro Rail (light rail metro)
- New York City Subway (rapid transit/heavy rail)
- Port Authority Trans-Hudson (PATH) (rapid transit/heavy rail)
- Staten Island Railway (SIR) (heavy rail/commuter rail/rapid transit)

=== Heritage railroad ===
- Adirondack Scenic Railroad (ADIX) (tourist railway/ heritage railroad)
- Arcade and Attica Railroad (ARA) (seasonally runs tourist trains; mostly a freight carrier)
- Catskill Mountain Railroad (CMRR) (heritage railroad)
- Cooperstown and Charlotte Valley Railroad (CACV) (heritage railroad)
- Delaware and Ulster Railroad (DURR) (heritage railroad)
- Medina Railroad Museum (heritage railroad)
- New York Museum of Transportation (heritage railroad)
- New York Transit Museum (operates historical trains throughout the New York City Subway System)
- Rochester & Genesee Valley Railroad Museum (RGVM) (operating railroad museum)
- Saratoga Corinth and Hudson Railway (heritage railroad)
- Tioga Central Railroad (heritage railroad)
- Trolley Museum of New York (heritage light rail)
- Upper Hudson River Railroad (heritage railroad)

== Defunct railroads ==
Name	Mark	System (Note: This is one or more of the Class I railroads that the railroad became part of, if any.)	From	To	Successor	Notes
Addison Railroad		RUT	1867	1951	N/A	
Addison and Northern Pennsylvania Railway		B&O	1882	1887	Addison and Pennsylvania Railway	
Addison and Pennsylvania Railway		B&O	1887	1898	Addison and Susquehanna Railroad	
Addison and Susquehanna Railroad		B&O	1898	1954	Buffalo and Susquehanna Railroad	
Adirondack Company		D&H	1863	1882	Adirondack Railway	
Adirondack Railway		D&H	1882	1902	Delaware and Hudson Company	
Adirondack Railway	ADIR		1976	1981		
Adirondac Estate and Railroad Company		D&H	1860	1863	Adirondack Company	
Adirondack and St. Lawrence Railroad			1906	1925	N/A	
Albany and Hudson Railway and Power Company			1899	1903	Albany and Hudson Railroad	Electrified in 1900
Albany Northern Railroad		D&H	1851	1856	Albany, Vermont and Canada Railroad	
Albany and Schenectady Railroad		NYC	1847	1853	New York Central Railroad	
Albany and Susquehanna Railroad		D&H	1851	1945	Delaware and Hudson Railroad	
Albany and Vermont Railroad		D&H	1859			
Albany, Vermont and Canada Railroad		D&H	1856	1859	Albany and Vermont Railroad	
Albany and West Stockbridge Railroad		NYC	1836	1870	Boston and Albany Railroad	
Allegany Central Railroad		PS&N	1881	1883	Lackawanna and Pittsburgh Railroad	
Amsterdam, Chuctanunda and Northern Railroad		NYC	1879			
Atlantic Avenue Railroad		LIRR	1872	1899	Nassau Electric Railroad	Main line operated by Long Island Rail Road under a 99-year lease from 1877
Atlantic and Great Western Railroad		ERIE	1871	1880	New York, Pennsylvania and Ohio Railroad	
Atlantic and Great Western Railroad		ERIE	1859	1865	Atlantic and Great Western Railway	
Atlantic and Great Western Railway		ERIE	1865	1871	Atlantic and Great Western Railroad	
Attica and Allegheny Valley Railroad			1852	1856	Attica and Arcade Railroad	
Attica and Buffalo Railroad		NYC	1836	1850	Buffalo and Rochester Railroad	
Attica and Arcade Railroad			1870	1880	Tonawanda Valley Railroad	
Attica and Freedom Railroad			1891	1894	Buffalo, Attica and Arcade Railroad	
Attica and Hornellsville Railroad		ERIE	1845	1851	Buffalo and New York City Railroad	
Auburn and Ithaca Railway		LV	1889	1890	Geneva and Van Ettenville Railway	
Auburn and Rochester Railroad		NYC	1836	1850	Rochester and Syracuse Railroad	
Auburn and Syracuse Railroad		NYC	1834	1850	Rochester and Syracuse Railroad	
Avon, Geneseo and Mount Morris Railroad		ERIE	1860	1940	N/A	
Baltimore and Ohio Railroad	B&O, BO	B&O	1932	1987	Chesapeake and Ohio Railway	
Bath and Hammondsport Railroad	BH		1872	1993	Champagne Railroad	
Battenkill Railroad		D&H	1902	1903	Greenwich and Johnsonville Railway	
Bennington and Rutland Railroad		RUT	1865	1870	Harlem Extension Railroad	
Bennington and Rutland Railway		RUT	1877	1901	Rutland Railroad	
Black River and Morristown Railroad		NYC	1870	1883	Utica and Black River Railroad	
Black River and St. Lawrence Railway		NYC	1868	1883	Carthage and Adirondack Railway	
Black River and Utica Railroad		NYC	1853	1860	Utica and Black River Railroad	
Blossburg and Corning Railroad		NYC	1854	1873	Corning, Cowanesque and Antrim Railway	
Bombay and Moira Railroad			1898	1898	N/A (operated by Ogdensburg and Lake Champlain Railroad)	
Boston and Albany Railroad	B&A, BA	NYC	1870	1961	New York Central Railroad	
Boston, Hartford and Erie Railroad		NH	1864	1874	New York and New England Railroad	
Boston, Hartford and Erie Extension Railroad		NH	1863	1864	Boston, Hartford and Erie Railroad	
Boston, Hartford and Erie Ferry Extension Railroad		NH	1864	1864	Boston, Hartford and Erie Railroad	
Boston, Hoosac Tunnel and Western Railway		B&M	1877	1892	Fitchburg Railroad	
Boston and Maine Corporation	BM	B&M	1964			Still exists as a lessor of Pan Am Railways operating subsidiary Springfield Terminal Railway
Boston and Maine Railroad	B&M, BM	B&M	1900	1964	Boston and Maine Corporation	
Bradford, Eldred and Cuba Railroad			1881	1893	N/A	
Bradford, Richburg and Cuba Railroad			1881	1893	N/A (operated by Bradford, Eldred and Cuba Railroad)	
Brighton and Bensonhurst Railroad			1892		N/A	Never operated
Brooklyn, Bath and Coney Island Railroad	BB&CI	BRT/BMT	1862	1885	Brooklyn, Bath and West End Railroad	
Brooklyn, Bath and West End Railroad		BRT/BMT	1885	1898	Atlantic Avenue Railroad	Electrified in 1893
Brooklyn and Brighton Beach Railroad		BRT/BMT	1887	1899	Sea View Railroad	
Brooklyn Central and Jamaica Railroad		LIRR	1860	1865	Brooklyn and Jamaica Railway	
Brooklyn Eastern District Terminal	BEDT		1906	1983	New York Cross Harbor Railroad Terminal Corporation	
Brooklyn, Flatbush and Coney Island Railway	BF&CI	BRT/BMT	1877	1887	Brooklyn and Brighton Beach Railroad	
Brooklyn and Jamaica Railroad		LIRR	1832	1860	Brooklyn Central and Jamaica Railroad	
Brooklyn and Jamaica Railway		LIRR	1866	1872	Atlantic Avenue Railroad	
Brooklyn and Montauk Railroad		LI	1879	1889	Long Island Rail Road	
Brooklyn and Rockaway Beach Railroad		BRT/BMT	1863	1906	Canarsie Railroad	
Buffalo and Allegheny Valley Railroad		PRR	1853	1865	Buffalo and Washington Railway	
Buffalo, Attica and Arcade Railroad			1894	1917	Arcade and Attica Railroad	
Buffalo and Black Rock Railroad			1833	1851		
Buffalo, Bradford and Pittsburgh Railroad		ERIE	1859	1941	Erie Railroad	
Buffalo Branch of the Erie Railway		ERIE	1861	1862	Erie Railway	
Buffalo, Chautauqua Lake and Pittsburgh Railway		PRR	1879	1880	Pittsburgh, Titusville and Buffalo Railway	
Buffalo, Cleveland and Chicago Railway		NKP	1881	1881	New York, Chicago and St. Louis Railway	
Buffalo and Cohocton Valley Railway		ERIE	1850	1852	Buffalo, Corning and New York Railroad	
Buffalo, Corning and New York Railroad		ERIE	1852	1857	Buffalo, New York and Erie Railroad	
Buffalo, Corry and Pittsburgh Railroad		PRR	1867	1872	Dunkirk, Chautauqua Lake and Pittsburgh Railroad	
Buffalo Creek Railroad	BCK	ERIE/ LV	1869	1983	Consolidated Rail Corporation	
Buffalo Creek Transfer Railroad			1881	1914	N/A	
Buffalo and Erie Railroad		NYC	1867	1869	Lake Shore and Michigan Southern Railway	
Buffalo Erie Basin Railroad		NYC	1876	1913	New York Central and Hudson River Railroad	
Buffalo Extension of the Atlantic and Great Western Railway		ERIE	1864	1865	Atlantic and Great Western Railway	
Buffalo and Geneva Railroad		LV	1889	1890	Lehigh Valley Railway	
Buffalo and Jamestown Railroad		ERIE	1872	1877	Buffalo and South Western Railroad	
Buffalo and Lockport Railroad		NYC	1852	1853	New York Central Railroad	
Buffalo and New York City Railroad		ERIE	1851	1861	Buffalo Branch of the Erie Railway, Buffalo, New York and Erie Railroad	
Buffalo, New York and Erie Railroad		ERIE	1857	1896	Erie Railroad	
Buffalo, New York and Philadelphia Railroad		PRR	1883	1887	Western New York and Pennsylvania Railway of New York	
Buffalo, New York and Philadelphia Railway		PRR	1871	1883	Buffalo, New York and Philadelphia Railroad	
Buffalo and Niagara Falls Railroad		NYC	1834	1869	New York Central Railroad	
Buffalo and Oil Creek Cross Cut Railroad		PRR	1865	1867	Buffalo, Corry and Pittsburgh Railroad	
Buffalo and Pittsburgh Railroad		ERIE	1852	1859	Buffalo, Bradford and Pittsburgh Railroad	
Buffalo, Pittsburgh and Western Railroad		PRR	1881	1883	Buffalo, New York and Philadelphia Railroad	
Buffalo, Pittsburgh and Western Railway		PRR	1880	1881	Buffalo, Pittsburgh and Western Railroad	
Buffalo and Rochester Railroad		NYC	1850	1853	New York Central Railroad	
Buffalo, Rochester and Pittsburgh Railroad		B&O	1885	1887	Buffalo, Rochester and Pittsburgh Railway	
Buffalo, Rochester and Pittsburgh Railroad		B&O	1881	1881	Rochester and Pittsburgh Railroad	
Buffalo, Rochester and Pittsburgh Railway	BR&P	B&O	1887			Still exists as a nonoperating subsidiary of CSX Transportation, leased to the Buffalo and Pittsburgh Railroad
Buffalo and South Western Railroad		ERIE	1877	1895	Erie Railroad	
Buffalo and State Line Railroad		NYC	1848	1867	Buffalo and Erie Railroad	
Buffalo and Susquehanna Railroad		B&O	1954	1954	Baltimore and Ohio Railroad	
Buffalo and Susquehanna Railroad	B&S	B&O	1910	1932	Baltimore and Ohio Railroad	
Buffalo and Susquehanna Railroad		B&O	1896	1907	Buffalo and Susquehanna Railway	
Buffalo and Susquehanna Railway			1902	1915	Wellsville and Buffalo Railroad	
Buffalo, Thousand Islands & Portland Railroad		NYC	1850	1907	Rome, Watertown and Ogdensburg Railroad	
Buffalo and Washington Railroad		PRR	1865	1865	Buffalo and Washington Railway	
Buffalo and Washington Railway		PRR	1865	1871	Buffalo, New York and Philadelphia Railway	
Bush Terminal Railroad			1903	1971	New York Cross Harbor Railroad	
Cairo Railroad			1884	1918	N/A (operated by Catskill Mountain Railroad)	
Campbell Hall Connecting Railroad		LNE	1889	1961	N/A	
Canada Southern Railway	CASO	NYC	1883	1904	Michigan Central Railroad	
Canajoharie and Catskill Railroad			1830	1842	Catskill Mountain Railroad	
Canal Railroad		LV	1878	1905	Lehigh Valley Railway	
Canandaigua and Corning Railroad		PRR	1845	1852	Canandaigua and Elmira Railroad	
Canandaigua and Elmira Railroad		PRR	1852	1857	Elmira, Canandaigua and Niagara Falls Railroad	
Canandaigua Lake Railroad		PRR	1887	1888	Elmira and Lake Ontario Railroad	
Canandaigua and Niagara Falls Railroad		NYC	1851	1857	Niagara Bridge and Canandaigua Railroad	
Canarsie Railroad		BRT/BMT	1906	1912	New York Consolidated Railroad	Electrified in 1906
Canastota Northern Railroad		LV	1886	1905	Elmira, Cortland and Northern Railroad	
Carthage and Adirondack Railway		NYC	1883	1913	New York Central and Hudson River Railroad	
Carthage and Copenhagen Railroad			1906	1917	Deer River Railroad	
Carthage, Watertown and Sackets Harbor Railroad		NYC	1869	1913	New York Central and Hudson River Railroad	
Castleton and West Stockbridge Railroad		NYC	1834	1836	Albany and West Stockbridge Railroad	
Catskill Mountain Railroad			1917	1918	N/A	
Catskill Mountain Railroad			1880	1885	Catskill Mountain Railway	
Catskill Mountain Railway			1885	1916	Catskill Mountain Railroad	
Catskill and Tannersville Railway			1892	1916	Catskill Mountain Railroad	
Cayuga Railway		LV	1874	1877	Cayuga Southern Railroad	
Cayuga Lake Railroad		LV	1867	1874	Cayuga Railway	
Cayuga Southern Railroad		LV	1877	1879	Geneva, Ithaca and Sayre Railroad	
Cayuga and Susquehanna Railroad		DL&W	1843	1946	Delaware, Lackawanna and Western Railroad	
Cazenovia and Canastota Railroad		LV	1868	1873	Cazenovia and Canastota Railway	
Cazenovia and Canastota Railway		LV	1873	1873	Cazenovia, Canastota and De Ruyter Railroad	
Cazenovia, Canastota and De Ruyter Railroad		LV	1873	1876	Cazenovia, Canastota and De Ruyter Railway	
Cazenovia, Canastota and De Ruyter Railway		LV	1876	1884	Elmira, Cortland and Northern Railroad	
Cazenovia and De Ruyter Railroad		LV	1872	1873	Cazenovia, Canastota and De Ruyter Railroad	
Central Railroad Extension Company		LI	1873	1882	Long Island Rail Road	
Central Railroad of Long Island		LI	1871	1879	Long Island Rail Road	
Central New England Railway	CNE	NH	1899	1927	New York, New Haven and Hartford Railroad	
Central New England and Western Railroad		NH	1889	1892	Philadelphia, Reading and New England Railroad	
Central New York and Northern Railroad		PS&N	1899	1899	Central New York and Western Railroad	
Central New York Southern Railroad			1914	1923	N/A	
Central New York and Western Railroad		PS&N	1892	1899	Pittsburg, Shawmut and Northern Railroad	
Central Valley Railroad			1870	1875	N/A	
Central Vermont Railroad		CN	1873	1899	Central Vermont Railway	
Central Vermont Railway	CV	CN	1898	1962	N/A	
Champagne Railroad	CGNE		1993	1996	Livonia, Avon and Lakeville Railroad	
Champlain and St. Lawrence Railroad		CN	1851	1960	Canadian National Railway	
Chateaugay Railroad		D&H	1879	1903	Chateaugay and Lake Placid Railway	
Chateaugay Railway		D&H	1887	1903	Chateaugay and Lake Placid Railway	
Chateaugay and Lake Placid Railway		D&H	1903	1957	Delaware and Hudson Railroad	
Chatham and Lebanon Valley Railroad		RUT	1899	1901	Rutland Railroad	
Chautauqua Lake Railway			1886	1894	Jamestown and Lake Erie Railway	
Chemung Railroad		PRR	1845	1886	Elmira and Lake Ontario Railroad	
Cherry Valley and Mohawk River Railroad		D&H	1864	1869	Cherry Valley, Sharon and Albany Railroad	
Cherry Valley, Sharon and Albany Railroad		D&H	1869	1908	Delaware and Hudson Company	
Cherry Valley and Sprakers Railroad		D&H	1860	1864	Cherry Valley and Mohawk River Railroad	
Chesapeake and Ohio Railway	C&O, CO	C&O	1947	1987	CSX Transportation	
Clayton and Theresa Railroad		NYC	1871	1886	Utica and Black River Railroad	
Clove Branch Railroad			1868	1898	N/A (operated by Newburgh, Dutchess and Connecticut Railroad)	
Conesus Lake Railroad		ERIE	1882	1932	Erie Railroad	
Coney Island and East River Railway			1876	1877	Brooklyn, Flatbush and Coney Island Railway	
Conhocton Valley Railroad			2001	2001	B&H Rail Corporation	
Connecting Terminal Railroad		PRR	1881	1931	Western New York and Pennsylvania Railway	
Consolidated Rail Corporation	CR		1976	1999	CSX Transportation, Norfolk Southern Railway	
Cooperstown and Charlotte Valley Railroad		D&H	1888	1957	Delaware and Hudson Railroad	
Cooperstown and Charlotte Valley Railway	CACV		1971	1989	N/A	
Cooperstown and Susquehanna Valley Railroad		D&H	1865	1957	Delaware and Hudson Railroad	
Corning and Blossburg Railroad		NYC	1851	1852	Blossburg and Corning Railroad	
Corning, Cowanesque and Antrim Railway		NYC	1873	1892	Fall Brook Railway	
Cornwall Bridge Company		NYC	1897	1917	New York Central Railroad	
Cranberry Lake Railroad			1902	1914	N/A	
Danbury Terminal Railroad	DTRR		1993	1996	Housatonic Railroad	
Dansville and Mount Morris Railroad	D&MM, DMM		1891			Still exists as a nonoperating subsidiary of the Rochester and Southern Railroad
Deer River Railroad			1917	1918	N/A	
Degnon Terminal Railroad		LIRR	1913	1928	Long Island Rail Road	
Delaware and Eastern Railroad			1904	1911	Delaware and Northern Railroad	
Delaware and Eastern Railway			1907	1911	Delaware and Northern Railroad	
Delaware and Hudson Company		D&H	1899	1930	Delaware and Hudson Railroad	
Delaware and Hudson Railroad	D&H	D&H	1930	1968	Delaware and Hudson Railway	
Delaware and Hudson Canal Company		D&H	1867	1899	Delaware and Hudson Company	
Delaware, Lackawanna and Western Railroad	DL&W, DLW	DL&W	1870	1960	Erie–Lackawanna Railroad	
Delaware and Northern Railroad	D&N		1911	1928	Delaware and Northern Railway	
Delaware and Northern Railway	D&N		1928	1942	N/A	
Delaware and Otsego Railroad		NYC	1887	1901	Ulster and Delaware Railroad	
Depew and Tonawanda Railroad		LV	1895	1903	Lehigh Valley Railway	
Dexter and Northern Railroad			1908	1956	N/A	
Direct Railway between Syracuse and Rochester		NYC	1848	1850	Rochester and Syracuse Railroad	
Dolgeville and Salisbury Railway		NYC	1907	1917	New York Central Railroad	
Dunkirk, Allegheny Valley and Pittsburgh Railroad		NYC	1873	1914	New York Central Railroad	
Dunkirk, Chautauqua Lake and Pittsburgh Railroad		PRR	1879	1879	Buffalo, Chautauqua Lake and Pittsburgh Railway	
Dunkirk and State Line Railroad		NYC	1850	1851	Buffalo and State Line Railroad	
Dunkirk, Warren and Pittsburgh Railroad		NYC	1867	1870	Dunkirk, Warren and Pittsburgh Railway	
Dunkirk, Warren and Pittsburgh Railway		NYC	1870	1873	Dunkirk, Allegheny Valley and Pittsburgh Railroad	
Dutchess and Columbia Railroad		NH	1866	1872	New York, Boston and Northern Railway	
Dutchess County Railroad		NH	1890	1907	Central New England Railway	
East River Terminal Railroad			1907	1916	Brooklyn Eastern District Terminal	
Ellenville and Kingston Railroad		NH	1901	1957	N/A	
Elmira, Canandaigua and Niagara Falls Railroad		PRR	1857	1858	Elmira, Jefferson and Canandaigua Railroad	
Elmira, Cortland and Northern Railroad		LV	1884	1905	Lehigh Valley Railway	
Elmira, Jefferson and Canandaigua Railroad		PRR	1859	1886	Elmira and Lake Ontario Railroad	
Elmira and Lake Ontario Railroad		PRR	1886	1956	Northern Central Railway	
Elmira State Line Railroad		ERIE	1872	1942	N/A	
Elmira and Williamsport Railroad		PRR	1860	1969	Penndel Company	
Erie Railroad	ERIE	ERIE	1895	1960	Erie–Lackawanna Railroad	
Erie Railway		ERIE	1861	1878	New York, Lake Erie and Western Railroad	
Erie and Black Rock Railroad		ERIE	1882	1932	Erie Railroad	
Erie and Central New York Railroad		DL&W	1902	1945	Delaware, Lackawanna and Western Railroad	
Erie and Central New York Railway		DL&W	1863	1902	Erie and Central New York Railroad	
Erie and Genesee Valley Railroad		ERIE	1868	1891	Dansville and Mount Morris Railroad	
Erie International Railway		ERIE	1872	1895	Erie Railroad	
Erie and Jersey Railroad		ERIE	1905	1915	Erie Railroad	
Erie–Lackawanna Railroad	EL		1960	1968	Erie Lackawanna Railway	
Erie Lackawanna Railway	EL		1968	1976	Consolidated Rail Corporation	
Erie and New York City Railroad		ERIE	1851	1860	Atlantic and Great Western Railroad	
Erie Terminals Railroad		ERIE	1907	1915	Erie Railroad	
Fall Brook Railway		NYC	1892	1909	Geneva, Corning and Southern Railroad	
Far Rockaway Branch Railroad		LI	1868	1872	South Side Railroad of Long Island	
Fitchburg Railroad		B&M	1887	1919	Boston and Maine Railroad	
Flatbush and Coney Island Park and Concourse Railroad			1876	1877	Brooklyn, Flatbush and Coney Island Railway	
Flushing Railroad		LI	1852	1859	New York and Flushing Railroad	
Flushing and North Side Railroad		LI	1868	1881	Long Island City and Flushing Railroad	
Flushing and Woodside Railroad		LI	1864	1871	Flushing and North Side Railroad	
Fonda, Johnstown and Gloversville Railroad	FJG		1867	1984	N/A	
Friendship Railroad		PS&N	1880	1881	Allegany Central Railroad	
Fulton Chain Railroad		NYC	1896	1902	Fulton Chain Railway	
Fulton Chain Railway		NYC	1902	1937	New York Central Railroad	
Fulton and Oswego Railroad		NYC	1885	1886	Syracuse, Phoenix and Oswego Railway	
Garnerville Railroad		ERIE	1875		N/A	
Genesee Falls Railway		NYC	1886			
Genesee River Railroad		ERIE	1905	1915	Erie Railroad	
Genesee Valley Canal Railroad		PRR	1880	1912	Pennsylvania and Rochester Railroad	
Genesee Valley Terminal Railroad		PRR	1882	1912	Pennsylvania and Rochester Railroad	
Genesee and Wyoming Railroad	GNW, GNWR		1899			Still exists as a nonoperating subsidiary of the Rochester and Southern Railroad
Genesee and Wyoming Valley Railway			1891	1899	Genesee and Wyoming Railroad	
Geneseo Valley Railroad		ERIE	1857	1860	Avon, Geneseo and Mount Morris Railroad	
Geneva, Corning and Southern Railroad		NYC	1909	1914	New York Central Railroad	
Geneva, Corning and Southern Railway		NYC	1875	1909	Geneva, Corning and Southern Railroad	
Geneva and Hornellsville Railway		PRR	1875	1876	Geneva, Hornellsville and Pine Creek Railway	
Geneva, Hornellsville and Pine Creek Railway		PRR	1876	1879	Lake Ontario Southern Railway	
Geneva and Ithaca Railroad		LV	1870	1874	Geneva, Ithaca and Athens Railroad	
Geneva, Ithaca and Athens Railroad		LV	1874	1876	Geneva, Ithaca and Sayre Railroad	
Geneva, Ithaca and Sayre Railroad		LV	1876	1889	Geneva and Sayre Railroad	
Geneva and Lyons Railroad		NYC	1877	1890	New York Central and Hudson River Railroad	
Geneva and Sayre Railroad		LV	1889	1890	Geneva and Van Ettenville Railway	
Geneva and Southwestern Railway		PRR	1871	1875	Geneva and Hornellsville Railway	
Geneva Southwestern and Hornellsville Railway		PRR	1872	1875	Geneva and Hornellsville Railway	
Geneva and Van Ettenville Railway		LV	1889	1890	Lehigh Valley Railway	
Glen Cove Branch Rail Road		LI	1865		Long Island Rail Road	
Glendale and East River Railroad		LI	1874	1928	Long Island Rail Road	
Glenfield and Western Railroad			1901		N/A	
Glens Falls Railroad		D&H	1867	1906	Rensselaer and Saratoga Railroad	
Gloversville and Broadalbin Railroad			1895	1931	Fonda, Johnstown and Gloversville Railroad	
Gloversville and Northville Railroad			1872	1881	Fonda, Johnstown and Gloversville Railroad	
Goshen and Deckertown Railway		ERIE	1868	1954	Erie Railroad	
Gouverneur and Oswegatchie Railroad		NYC	1892	1913	New York Central and Hudson River Railroad	
Grand Trunk Railway	GT	CN	1864	1923	Canadian National Railway	
Grasse River Railroad	GR		1915	1959	N/A	
Great Neck and Port Washington Railroad		LI	1896	1902	Long Island Rail Road	
Great Valley and Bradford Railroad		B&O	1881	1881	Rochester and Pittsburgh Railroad	
Great Western Railway		CN	1855	1882	Grand Trunk Railway	
Greigsville and Pearl Creek Railroad			1897	1899	N/A	
Greene Railroad		DL&W	1869	1946	Delaware, Lackawanna and Western Railroad	
Greenwich and Johnsonville Railroad		D&H	1874	1879	Greenwich and Johnsonville Railway	
Greenwich and Johnsonville Railway	G&J, GJ	D&H	1879	1982	Batten Kill Railroad	
Greenwood and Coney Island Railroad			1872	1874	Prospect Park and Coney Island Railroad	
Hackensack and New York Extension Railroad		ERIE	1869	1873	New Jersey and New York Railway	
Halite and Northern Railroad			1910	1933	N/A (operated by Genesee and Wyoming Railroad)	
Hancock and East Branch Railroad			1906	1907	Delaware and Eastern Railway	
Hancock and Pennsylvania Railroad		NH	1889	1889	Ontario, Carbondale and Scranton Railway	
Harlem Extension Railroad		RUT	1870	1873	New York, Boston and Montreal Railway	
Harlem Extension Railroad South Coal Transportation Company		RUT	1877	1880	N/A	Leased the New York, Boston and Montreal Railway
Harlem River and Port Chester Railroad		NH	1866	1927	New York, New Haven and Hartford Railroad	
Hartford and Connecticut Western Railroad		NH	1882	1947	New York, New Haven and Hartford Railroad	
Hayts Corners, Ovid and Willard Railroad		LV	1882	1959	N/A	
Hempstead and Rockaway Railroad		LIRR	1869	1871	New York and Hempstead Railroad	
Herkimer, Newport and Poland Railway		NYC	1891	1892	Mohawk and Malone Railway	
Herkimer, Newport and Poland Extension Railway		NYC	1891	1892	Mohawk and Malone Railway	
Herkimer, Newport and Poland Narrow Gauge Railway		NYC	1880	1891	Herkimer, Newport and Poland Railway	
Hicksville and Cold Spring Branch Railroad		LI	1853	1870	Long Island Rail Road	
Hobart Branch Railroad		NYC	1884	1901	Ulster and Delaware Railroad	
Hoosac Tunnel and Saratoga Railway		B&M	1881	1886	Troy, Saratoga and Northern Railroad	
Hudson and Berkshire Railroad		NYC	1832	1854	Hudson and Boston Railroad	
Hudson and Boston Railroad		NYC	1855	1870	Boston and Albany Railroad	
Hudson Connecting Railroad		NH	1887	1889	Central New England and Western Railroad	
Hudson Light and Power and Railroad Company			1899	1899	Albany and Hudson Railway and Power Company	
Hudson River Railroad		NYC	1846	1869	New York Central and Hudson River Railroad	
Hudson River Bridge Company at Albany		NYC	1856	1976	Consolidated Rail Corporation	
Hudson River Connecting Railroad		NYC	1913	1964	New York Central Railroad	
Hudson River West Shore Railroad		NYC	1867	1868	West Shore Hudson River Railroad	
Hunter's Point and South Side Railroad		LI	1870	1872	South Side Railroad of Long Island	
International Bridge Company		CN	1857	1956	Canadian National Railway	
Island Railroad			1883			
Ithaca and Athens Railroad		LV	1870	1874	Geneva, Ithaca and Athens Railroad	
Ithaca, Auburn and Western Railroad		LV	1876	1890	Auburn and Ithaca Railway	
Ithaca and Cortland Railroad		LV	1869	1871	Utica, Ithaca and Elmira Railroad	
Ithaca and Owego Railroad		DL&W	1828	1843	Cayuga and Susquehanna Railroad	
Ithaca and Tonawanda Railroad		LV	1865	1870	Ithaca and Athens Railroad	
Jamaica and South Shore Railroad		LI	1903	1912	Long Island Rail Road	
Jamestown and Chautauqua Railway			1898	1913	Jamestown, Westfield and Northwestern Railroad	
Jamestown, Chautauqua and Lake Erie Railway			1900	1913	Jamestown, Westfield and Northwestern Railroad	
Jamestown and Lake Erie Railway			1894	1898	Jamestown and Chautauqua Railway	
Jamestown, Westfield and Northwestern Railroad			1913	1950	N/A	Electric from 1914 to 1947
Jay Street Connecting Railroad			1909			
Jay Street Extension Railroad			1916	1916	Jay Street Connecting Railroad	
Jersey City and Albany Railroad		NYC	1873	1877	Jersey City and Albany Railway	
Jersey City and Albany Railway		NYC	1878	1881	North River Railroad	
Junction Railroad		NYC	1870	1879	New York Central and Hudson River Railroad	
Kaaterskill Railroad		NYC	1882	1901	Ulster and Delaware Railroad	
Kanona and Prattsburg Railroad			1886	1893	Kanona and Prattsburg Railway	
Kanona and Prattsburg Railway			1897	1917	Prattsburg Railway	
Keeseville, Ausable Chasm and Lake Champlain Railroad			1889	1924	N/A	Electric from 1905 to 1911
Kinderhook and Hudson Railway			1889	1899	Hudson Light and Power and Railroad Company	
Kings County Central Railroad			1876	1878	N/A	
Lackawanna and Pittsburgh Railroad		PS&N	1882	1889	Lackawanna and Southwestern Railroad	
Lackawanna and Southwestern Railroad		PS&N	1889	1892	Central New York and Western Railroad	
Lackawanna and Susquehanna Railroad		D&H	1867			
Lake Champlain and Moriah Railroad			1867	1968	N/A	
Lake Ontario Railroad		NYC	1874	1875	Rome, Watertown and Ogdensburg Railroad	
Lake Ontario and Hudson River Railroad		D&H	1857	1860	Adirondac Estate and Railroad Company	
Lake Ontario Shore Railroad		NYC	1868	1874	Lake Ontario Railroad	
Lake Ontario Southern Railway		PRR	1879	1882	Sodus Bay and Southern Railroad	
Lake Shore and Michigan Southern Railway		NYC	1869	1914	New York Central Railroad	
Lebanon Springs Railroad		RUT	1893	1899	Chatham and Lebanon Valley Railroad	
Lebanon Springs Railroad		RUT	1852	1870	Harlem Extension Railroad	
Lehigh – Buffalo Terminal Railway		LV	1915			
Lehigh and Hudson River Railway	L&HR, LHR	L&HR	1882	1976	Consolidated Rail Corporation	
Lehigh and Lake Erie Railroad		LV	1896	1907	Lehigh Valley Railway	
Lehigh and New England Railroad	LNE	LNE	1895	1961	N/A	
Lehigh and New York Railroad		LV	1895	1949	Lehigh Valley Railroad	
Lehigh Valley Railroad	LV	LV	1888	1976	Consolidated Rail Corporation	
Lehigh Valley Railway		LV	1882	1949	Lehigh Valley Railroad	
Lewiston Railroad		NYC	1836	1855	New York Central Railroad	
Lincoln Park and Charlotte Railroad		B&O	1888	1899	Buffalo, Rochester and Pittsburgh Railway	
Little Falls and Dolgeville Railroad		NYC	1891	1913	New York Central and Hudson River Railroad	
Lockport and Buffalo Railway		ERIE	1871	1895	Erie Railroad	
Lockport and Niagara Falls Railroad		NYC	1834	1850	Rochester, Lockport and Niagara Falls Railroad	
Long Island Rail Road	LI	LI	1834	1997	New York and Atlantic Railway	Still exists as a passenger railroad
Long Island Railroad North Shore Branch		LI	1892	1921	Long Island Rail Road	
Long Island City and Flushing Railroad		LI	1881	1889	Long Island Rail Road	
Long Island City and Manhattan Beach Railroad		LI	1883	1885	New York, Brooklyn and Manhattan Beach Railway	
Mahopac Falls Railroad		NYC	1884	1913	New York and Putnam Railroad	
Malone and St. Lawrence Railway		NYC	1891	1895	St. Lawrence and Adirondack Railway	
Marcellus Electric Railroad			1887	1905	Marcellus and Otisco Lake Railway	
Marcellus and Otisco Company			1919	1959	N/A	
Marcellus and Otisco Lake Railway			1905	1920	Marcellus and Otisco Company	
Marion Railway		PRR	1917	1931	Elmira and Lake Ontario Railroad	
Massena Springs and Fort Covington Railroad		CN	1884	1888	United States and Canada Railroad	
Mayville Extension Railroad			1881	1887	Chautauqua Lake Railway	
Mechanicville and Fort Edward Railroad		B&M	1880			
Michigan Central Railroad	MC	NYC	1904	1930	New York Central Railroad	
Middleburgh and Schoharie Railroad			1867	1936	N/A	
Middlesex Valley Railroad		LV	1892	1903	Lehigh Valley Railway	
Middletown and Crawford Railroad		ERIE	1868	1932	Erie Railroad	
Middletown and New Jersey Railway	MNJ		1947	2009	Middletown and New Jersey Railroad	
Middletown and Unionville Railroad	M&U, MU		1913	1947	Middletown and New Jersey Railway	
Middletown, Unionville and Water Gap Railroad		ERIE	1866	1913	Middletown and Unionville Railroad	
Midland Railroad of New Jersey		ERIE	1880	1881	New York, Susquehanna and Western Railroad	
Mohawk and Adirondack Railroad		NYC	1891	1891	Herkimer, Newport and Poland Extension Railway, St. Lawrence and Adirondack Railroad	
Mohawk and Hudson Railroad		NYC	1826	1847	Albany and Schenectady Railroad	
Mohawk and Malone Railway		NYC	1892	1913	New York Central and Hudson River Railroad	
Mohawk Valley Railroad		NYC	1851	1853	New York Central Railroad	
Mohawk Valley and Northern Railway		NYC	1890	1891	Herkimer, Newport and Poland Narrow Gauge Railway	
Montauk Extension Railroad		LI	1893	1902	Long Island Rail Road	
Montclair Railway		ERIE	1867	1875	Montclair and Greenwood Lake Railway	
Montclair and Greenwood Lake Railway		ERIE	1875	1878	New York and Greenwood Lake Railway	
Montgomery and Erie Railway		ERIE	1866	1954	Erie Railroad	
Monticello and Port Jervis Railway		NH	1869	1875	Port Jervis and Monticello Railroad	
Montreal and Champlain Railroad		CN	1857	1864	Grand Trunk Railway	
Montreal and Plattsburgh Railroad		D&H	1868	1873	New York and Canada Railroad	
Mount McGregor Railroad			1889	1897	Saratoga and Mount McGregor Railway	
Nanuet and New City Railroad		ERIE	1871		New Jersey and New York Railroad	
Napierville Junction Railway	NJ	D&H				Still exists as a nonoperating subsidiary of the Canadian Pacific Railway
New England Railroad		NH	1895	1908	New York, New Haven and Hartford Railroad	
New Jersey Midland Railway		ERIE	1874	1880	Midland Railroad of New Jersey	
New Jersey and New York Railroad		ERIE	1880	1967	Erie–Lackawanna Railroad	
New Jersey and New York Railway		ERIE	1873	1880	New Jersey and New York Railroad	
New Jersey and New York Extension Railroad		ERIE	1886	1936	New Jersey and New York Railroad	
New York and Albany Railroad		NYC	1832	1846	New York and Harlem Railroad	
New York and Atlantic Railway			1880	1887	West Brooklyn Railroad	
New York, Auburn and Lansing Railroad			1900	1914	Central New York Southern Railroad	
New York Bay Extension Railroad		LI	1892	1902	Long Island Rail Road	
New York, Bay Ridge and Jamaica Railroad		LI	1875	1885	New York, Brooklyn and Manhattan Beach Railway	
New York and Boston Railroad		NYC	1869	1872	New York, Boston and Northern Railway	
New York, Boston and Montreal Railway		NH, NYC, RUT	1873	1876	Bennington and Rutland Railway, New York, Rutland and Montreal Railroad, New York, Westchester and Putnam Railway, Newburgh, Dutchess and Connecticut Railroad	
New York, Boston and Northern Railway		NH, NYC	1872	1873	New York, Boston and Montreal Railway	
New York and Brighton Beach Railway			1878	1884	Sea Beach and Brighton Railroad	
New York, Brooklyn and Manhattan Beach Railway		LI	1885	1925	Long Island Rail Road	
New York and Canada Railroad		D&H	1872	1908	Delaware and Hudson Company	
New York Central Railroad	NYC	NYC	1914	1968	Penn Central Transportation Company	
New York Central Railroad		NYC	1853	1869	New York Central and Hudson River Railroad	
New York Central and Hudson River Railroad		NYC	1869	1914	New York Central Railroad	
New York Central Niagara River Railroad		NYC	1877	1913	New York Central and Hudson River Railroad	
New York, Chicago and St. Louis Railroad	NKP	NKP	1887	1964	Norfolk and Western Railway	
New York, Chicago and St. Louis Railway		NKP	1881	1887	New York, Chicago and St. Louis Railroad	
New York City and Northern Railroad		NYC	1878	1887	New York and Northern Railway	
New York and Coney Island Railroad			1879		South Brooklyn Railway	Electrified in 1899
New York Connecting Railroad	NYCN	NH/ PRR	1892	1976	Consolidated Rail Corporation	
New York Cross Harbor Railroad Terminal Corporation	NYCH		1983	2006	New York New Jersey Rail, LLC	
New York Dock Railway	NYD		1910	1983	New York Cross Harbor Railroad Terminal Corporation	
New York and Eastern Railway	NYER		2003	2004	N/A	Never operated
New York and Erie Railroad		ERIE	1832	1861	Erie Railway	
New York and Flushing Railroad		LI	1859	1891	Long Island Rail Road	
New York and Greenwood Lake Railway		ERIE	1878	1943	Erie Railroad	
New York and Harlem Railroad		NYC	1831			Still exists as a lessor of the Metro-North Commuter Railroad
New York and Hempstead Railroad		LIRR	1871	1875	Southern Hempstead Branch Railroad	
New York and Hempstead Plains Railroad		LIRR	1870	1871	New York and Hempstead Railroad	
New York, Housatonic and Northern Railroad			1863	1881	Westchester Railway	
New York and Jamaica Railroad		LI	1859	1860	Long Island Rail Road	
New York, Kingston and Syracuse Railroad		NYC	1872	1875	Ulster and Delaware Railroad	
New York, Lackawanna and Western Railway		DL&W	1880	1945	Delaware, Lackawanna and Western Railroad	
New York, Lake Erie and Western Railroad		ERIE	1878	1895	Erie Railroad	
New York and Long Beach Railroad		LI	1880	1907	Long Island Rail Road	
New York and Mahopac Railroad		NYC	1871	1880	New York and Harlem Railroad	
New York and Manhattan Beach Railway	NY&MB	LI	1876	1885	New York, Brooklyn and Manhattan Beach Railway	
New York and Massachusetts Railway		NH	1887	1893	Poughkeepsie and Eastern Railway	
New York and New England Railroad		NH	1873	1895	New England Railroad	
New York and New Haven Railroad		NH	1846	1872	New York, New Haven and Hartford Railroad	
New York, New Haven and Hartford Railroad	NH	NH	1872	1969	Penn Central Transportation Company	
New York and Northern Railway		NYC	1887	1893	New York and Putnam Railroad	
New York, Ontario and Western Railway	O&W, OW	NH	1880	1957	N/A	
New York and Oswego Midland Railroad		NH	1866	1879	Ithaca, Auburn and Western Railroad, New York, Ontario and Western Railway	
New York and Ottawa Railroad		NYC	1897	1904	New York and Ottawa Railway	
New York and Ottawa Railway		NYC	1905	1913	New York Central and Hudson River Railroad	
New York, Pennsylvania and Ohio Railroad		ERIE	1880	1896	Nypano Railroad	
New York and Pennsylvania Railroad			1896	1902	New York and Pennsylvania Railway	
New York and Pennsylvania Railway			1904	1935	N/A	
New York and Putnam Railroad		NYC	1894	1913	New York Central and Hudson River Railroad	
New York and Rockaway Railroad		LI	1870	1903	Jamaica and South Shore Railroad	
New York and Rockaway Beach Railway		LI	1887	1921	Long Island Rail Road	
New York, Rutland and Montreal Railroad		RUT	1883	1893	Lebanon Springs Railroad	
New York and Sea Beach Railway	NY&SB	BRT/BMT	1876	1896	Sea Beach Railway	
New York, Susquehanna and Western Railroad		ERIE	1881	1958	N/A	
New York, West Shore and Buffalo Railway		NYC	1880	1885	West Shore Railroad	
New York, West Shore and Chicago Railroad		NYC	1870	1879	New York, West Shore and Buffalo Railway	
New York, Westchester and Boston Railway (NYW&B)			1912	1937	N/A	Partly owned by the New York, New Haven and Hartford Railroad
New York, Westchester and Putnam Railway		NYC	1877	1878	New York City and Northern Railroad	
New York, Woodhaven and Rockaway Railroad		LI	1877	1887	New York and Rockaway Beach Railway	
Newark and Marion Railway		PRR	1900	1917	Marion Railway	
Newburgh, Dutchess and Connecticut Railroad		NH	1877	1907	Central New England Railway	
Newburgh and New York Railway		ERIE	1865	1895	New York, Lake Erie and Western Railroad	
Newton Falls and Northern Railroad			1908	1919	N/A	
Newtown and Flushing Railroad		LIRR	1871	1876	N/A	
Niagara Bridge and Canandaigua Railroad		NYC	1858	1890	New York Central and Hudson River Railroad	
Niagara Falls Branch Railroad		NYC	1875	1913	New York Central and Hudson River Railroad	
Niagara Falls International Bridge Company		CN	1846			
Niagara Junction Railway	NJ, NIAJ	ERIE/ LV/ NYC	1892	1976	Consolidated Rail Corporation	Electrified in 1913
Niagara River Bridge Company		NYC	1881	2002	N/A	Still exists as an abandoned subsidiary of CNCP Niagara–Windsor Partnership, a nonoperating joint subsidiary of the Canadian National Railway and Canadian Pacific Railway
Nickel Plate Connecting Railroad		NKP	1917			
Norfolk and Western Railway	N&W, NW		1964	1998	Norfolk Southern Railway	
North River Railroad		NYC	1881	1881	New York, West Shore and Buffalo Railway	
North River Railway		NYC	1880	1881	North River Railroad	
North Shore Railroad		LI	1863	1884	Long Island City and Flushing Railroad	
Northern Railroad		RUT	1845	1865	Ogdensburg and Lake Champlain Railroad	
Northern Railroad of New Jersey		ERIE	1858	1943	Erie Railroad	
Northern Adirondack Railroad		NYC	1883	1895	Northern New York Railroad	
Northern Adirondack Extension Railroad		NYC	1886	1890	Northern Adirondack Railroad	
Northern Central Railway		PRR	1956	1976	Consolidated Rail Corporation	
Northern Central Railway		PRR	1863	1911	Pennsylvania Railroad	
Northern Extension of the Rochester, Nunda and Pennsylvania Railroad		PRR	1872	1872	Rochester, Nunda and Pennsylvania Railroad	
Northern New York Railroad		NYC	1895	1897	New York and Ottawa Railroad	
Norwood and Montreal Railroad		NYC	1884	1889	Rome, Watertown and Ogdensburg Railroad	
Norwood and St. Lawrence Railroad	NSL		1901	1974	Ogdensburg and Norwood Railway	
Nyack and Northern Railroad		ERIE	1868	1892	Nyack and Southern Railroad	
Nyack and Southern Railroad		ERIE	1899	1944	Erie Railroad	
Nypano Railroad		ERIE	1896	1941	Erie Railroad	
Ogdensburg and Lake Champlain Railroad		RUT	1864	1898	Ogdensburg and Lake Champlain Railway	
Ogdensburg and Lake Champlain Railway		RUT	1898	1899	Rutland Railroad	
Ogdensburg and Morristown Railroad		NYC	1871	1886	Utica and Black River Railroad	
Ogdensburg and Norwood Railway	ONRY		1965	1977	St. Lawrence Railroad	
Olean Railroad		PS&N	1880	1881	Allegany Central Railroad	
Olean, Bradford and Warren Railroad		PRR	1877	1916	Western New York and Pennsylvania Railway	
Olean and Salamanca Railroad		PRR	1882	1883	Buffalo, New York and Philadelphia Railroad	
Ontario, Carbondale and Scranton Railway		NH	1889	1957	N/A	
Ontario Eastern Railroad	ONER		1981	1987	N/A	
Ontario Southern Railroad		PRR	1875	1879	Lake Ontario Southern Railway	
Orange County Railroad		L&HR	1888	1907	Lehigh and Hudson River Railway	
Oswego Railroad Bridge Company		NYC	1872	1885	Rome, Watertown and Ogdensburg Railroad	
Oswego and Rome Railroad		NYC	1863	1913	New York Central and Hudson River Railroad	
Oswego and Syracuse Railroad		DL&W	1839	1945	Delaware, Lackawanna and Western Railroad	
Otis Railway			1899	1916	Catskill Mountain Railroad	
Otis Elevating Railway			1885	1899	Otis Railway	
Owasco River Railway	OR	LV/ NYC	1881	1976	N/A	
Oyster Bay Extension Railroad		LI	1886	1913	Long Island Rail Road	
Pan Am Railways	PAR	NY, New England	1981	2022	CSX Transportation	
Pecksport Connecting Railway		NH	1886	1957	N/A	
Peekskill Valley Railroad			1873		N/A	7 miles (11.3 km) long 2 ft (610 mm) gauge
Penn Central Transportation Company	PC		1968	1976	Consolidated Rail Corporation	
Penn Yan and New York Railway		NYC	1877	1885	Syracuse, Geneva and Corning Railway	
Penndel Company		PRR	1955	1976	Consolidated Rail Corporation	
Pennsylvania Railroad	PRR	PRR	1900	1968	Penn Central Transportation Company	
Pennsylvania, New York and Long Island Railroad		PRR	1902	1907	Pennsylvania Tunnel and Terminal Railroad	
Pennsylvania and New York Canal and Railroad Company		LV	1867	1888	Lehigh Valley Railroad	
Pennsylvania, Poughkeepsie and Boston Railroad		LNE	1887	1895	Lehigh and New England Railroad	
Pennsylvania and Rochester Railroad		PRR	1912	1916	Western New York and Pennsylvania Railway	
Pennsylvania Tunnel and Terminal Railroad		PRR	1907	1976	Consolidated Rail Corporation	
Pere Marquette Railroad		C&O	1904	1917	Pere Marquette Railway	
Pere Marquette Railway	PM	C&O	1917	1947	Chesapeake and Ohio Railway	
Perry Railroad		B&O	1882	1899	Buffalo, Rochester and Pittsburgh Railway	
Philadelphia, Reading and New England Railroad		NH	1892	1899	Central New England Railway	
Pine Plains and Albany Railroad		RUT	1872	1872	Harlem Extension Railroad	
Pittsburgh and New York Railroad		B&O	1881	1881	Rochester and Pittsburgh Railroad	
Pittsburg, Shawmut and Northern Railroad		PS&N	1899	1947	N/A	
Pittsburgh, Titusville and Buffalo Railway		PRR	1880	1881	Buffalo, Pittsburgh and Western Railroad	
Plattsburgh and Dannemora Railroad		D&H	1878			
Plattsburgh and Montreal Railroad		D&H	1850	1868	Montreal and Plattsburgh Railroad	
Pochuck Railroad		LNE	1897	1944	N/A	
Port Chester Terminal Railroad			1901			
Port Dickinson and Chenango River Railroad		DL&W	1881		N/A	
Port Jervis and Monticello Railroad		NH	1875	1886	Port Jervis, Monticello and New York Railroad	
Port Jervis, Monticello and New York Railroad		NH	1886	1902	Port Jervis, Monticello and Summitville Railroad	
Port Jervis, Monticello and Summitville Railroad		NH	1902	1957	N/A	
Potsdam and Watertown Railroad		NYC	1852	1860	Watertown and Rome Railroad	
Poughkeepsie Bridge Company		NH	1871	1892	Poughkeepsie Bridge and Railroad Company	
Poughkeepsie Bridge Railroad		NH	1888	1907	Central New England Railway	
Poughkeepsie Bridge and Railroad Company		NH	1892	1892	Philadelphia, Reading and New England Railroad	
Poughkeepsie and Connecticut Railroad		NH	1888	1889	Central New England and Western Railroad	
Poughkeepsie and Eastern Railroad		NH	1866	1875	Poughkeepsie, Hartford and Boston Railroad	
Poughkeepsie and Eastern Railway		NH	1893	1907	Central New England Railway	
Poughkeepsie, Hartford and Boston Railroad		NH	1875	1887	Hartford and Connecticut Western Railroad, New York and Massachusetts Railway	
Prattsburg Railway			1917	1962	N/A	
Prospect Park and Coney Island Railroad	PP&CI		1874			Electrified in 1899
Prospect Park and South Brooklyn Railroad	PP&SB		1888			Electrified in 1899
Putnam and Dutchess Railroad			1871	1872	New York, Boston and Northern Railway	
Raquette Lake Railway		NYC	1899	1933	N/A	
Raymondville and Waddington Railroad			1907	1908	Norwood and St. Lawrence Railroad	
Rensselaer and Saratoga Railroad		D&H	1832	1945	Delaware and Hudson Railroad	
Rhinebeck and Connecticut Railroad		NH	1870	1882	Hartford and Connecticut Western Railroad	
R.J. Corman Railroad/Allentown Lines	RJCN		1996	2002	N/A	
Rochester and Charlotte Railroad		B&O	1881	1881	Rochester and Pittsburgh Railroad	
Rochester and Genesee Valley Railroad		ERIE	1851	1976	Consolidated Rail Corporation	
Rochester and Honeoye Valley Railroad		LV	1888	1895	Rochester Southern Railroad	
Rochester, Hornellsville and Lackawanna Railroad		PS&N	1886	1889	Lackawanna and Southwestern Railroad	
Rochester, Hornellsville and Pine Creek Railroad		PRR	1872	1876	Geneva, Hornellsville and Pine Creek Railway	
Rochester and Lake Beach Railroad		NYC	1888	1888	Rome, Watertown and Ogdensburg Terminal Railroad	
Rochester and Lake Ontario Railroad		NYC	1852	1855	New York Central Railroad	
Rochester, Lockport and Niagara Falls Railroad		NYC	1850	1853	New York Central Railroad	
Rochester, New York and Pennsylvania Railroad		PRR, PS&N	1881	1916	Allegany Central Railroad, Western New York and Pennsylvania Railway	
Rochester, Nunda and Pennsylvania Railroad		PRR, PS&N	1870	1877	Rochester, Nunda and Pittsburgh Railroad	
Rochester, Nunda and Pennsylvania Extension Railroad		PS&N	1872	1872	Rochester, Nunda and Pennsylvania Railroad	
Rochester, Nunda and Pittsburgh Railroad		PRR	1877	1881	Rochester, New York and Pennsylvania Railroad	
Rochester and Ontario Belt Railway		NYC	1882	1887	Rochester and Lake Beach Railroad	
Rochester and Pine Creek Railroad		B&O	1870	1877	Silver Lake Railroad	
Rochester and Pittsburgh Railroad		B&O	1881	1885	Buffalo, Rochester and Pittsburgh Railroad	
Rochester Southern Railroad		LV	1895	1903	Lehigh Valley Railway	
Rochester and Southern Railroad		LV	1895	1895	Rochester Southern Railroad	
Rochester and State Line Railroad		B&O	1869	1881	Rochester and Pittsburgh Railroad	
Rochester and Syracuse Railroad		NYC	1850	1853	New York Central Railroad	
Rockaway Railway		LI	1871	1872	South Side Railroad of Long Island	
Rockland Central Railroad		NYC	1870	1873	Jersey City and Albany Railroad	
Rockland Central Extension Railroad		NYC	1872	1872	Rockland Central Railroad	
Rome and Clinton Railroad		NH	1869	1944	New York, Ontario and Western Railway	
Rome, Watertown and Ogdensburg Railroad		NYC	1861	1913	New York Central and Hudson River Railroad	
Rome, Watertown and Ogdensburg Terminal Railroad		NYC	1886	1890	Rome, Watertown and Ogdensburg Railroad	
Rondout and Oswego Railroad		NYC	1866	1872	New York, Kingston and Syracuse Railroad	
Rutland Railroad	RUT	RUT	1899	1950	Rutland Railway	
Rutland Railway	RUT	RUT	1950	1961	New York Central Railroad	
Rutland–Canadian Railroad		RUT	1898	1901	Rutland Railroad	
Rutland and Washington Railroad		D&H	1850	1865	Troy, Salem and Rutland Railroad	
Sackets Harbor and Ellisburg Railroad			1851	1858	Sackett's Harbor, Rome and New York Railroad	
Sackett's Harbor, Rome and New York Railroad			1860	1862	N/A	
Sackets Harbor and Saratoga Railroad		D&H	1852	1857	Lake Ontario and Hudson River Railroad	
St. Lawrence Railroad	SLAW		1977	1990	St. Lawrence and Raquette River Railroad	
St. Lawrence and Adirondack Railroad		NYC	1891	1892	Mohawk and Malone Railway	
St. Lawrence and Adirondack Railway		NYC	1895			Still exists as a nonoperating subsidiary of CSX Transportation
St. Lawrence and Hudson Railway	STLH	CP	1996	2001	Canadian Pacific Railway	
St. Lawrence and Raquette River Railroad	SLRR		1990	1998	New York and Ogdensburg Railway	
Salamanca, Bradford and Allegheny River Railroad		PRR	1880	1881	Buffalo, Pittsburgh and Western Railroad	
Saranac and Lake Placid Railroad		D&H	1890	1903	Chateaugay and Lake Placid Railway	
Saratoga and Fort Edward Railroad		D&H	1832		Saratoga and Washington Railroad	
Saratoga and Hudson River Railroad		NYC	1864	1867	New York Central Railroad	
Saratoga Lake Railway		B&M	1880	1886	Troy, Saratoga and Northern Railroad	
Saratoga and Mount McGregor Railway			1897	1898	Saratoga Northern Railway	
Saratoga and North Creek Railway			2011	2018		
Saratoga, Mount McGregor and Lake George Railroad			1882	1888	Mount McGregor Railroad	
Saratoga Northern Railway			1899	1901	Hudson Valley Railway (electric)	
Saratoga and St. Lawrence Railroad			1885	1897	Bombay and Moira Railroad	
Saratoga and Schenectady Railroad		D&H	1831			
Saratoga and Schuylerville Railroad			1945	1956	N/A	
Saratoga and Washington Railroad		D&H	1834	1855	Saratoga and Whitehall Railroad	
Saratoga and Whitehall Railroad		D&H	1855	1868	Rensselaer and Saratoga Railroad	
Schenectady and Duanesburgh Railroad		D&H	1873	1903	Delaware and Hudson Company	
Schenectady and Margaretville Railroad			1906	1907	Delaware and Eastern Railway	
Schenectady and Mechanicville Railroad		D&H	1867			
Schenectady and Susquehanna Railroad		D&H	1869	1873	Schenectady and Duanesburgh Railroad	
Schenectady and Troy Railroad		NYC	1836	1853	New York Central Railroad	
Schoharie Valley Railroad		D&H	1865	1874	Schoharie Valley Railway	
Schoharie Valley Railway		D&H	1880	1941	N/A	
Schuylerville and Upper Hudson Railroad		B&M	1869	1877	Mechanicville and Fort Edward Railroad	
Scottsville and LeRoy Railroad			1836		N/A	
Sea Beach Railway			1896	1912	New York Consolidated Railroad	Electrified in 1898
Sea Beach and Brighton Railroad			1886	1892	Brighton and Bensonhurst Railroad	
Seneca County Railway		LV	1891	1903	Lehigh Valley Railway	
Sharon and Ceres Terminal Railroad			1904	1904	New York and Pennsylvania Railway	
Shawmut Connecting Railroad		PS&N	1900	1905	Pittsburg, Shawmut and Northern Railroad	
Silver Creek and Dunkirk Railway		NYC	1890	1894	Lake Shore and Michigan Southern Railway	
Silver Lake Railroad		B&O	1877	1886	Silver Lake Railway	
Silver Lake Railroad		B&O	1869		Rochester and Pine Creek Railroad	
Silver Lake Railway		B&O	1886	1910	Buffalo, Rochester and Pittsburgh Railway	
Skaneateles Railroad			1866	1941	Skaneateles Short Line Railroad	
Skaneateles Railroad			1836	1841	Skaneateles and Jordan Railroad	
Skaneateles and Jordan Railroad			1841	1851	N/A	
Skaneateles Short Line Railroad	SSL		1940	1981	N/A	
Smithtown and Port Jefferson Railroad		LI	1870	1892	Long Island Railroad North Shore Branch	
Sodus Bay and Southern Railroad		PRR	1882	1886	Elmira and Lake Ontario Railroad	
Sodus Point and Southern Railroad		PRR	1852	1875	Ontario Southern Railroad	
South Brooklyn Railroad and Terminal Company			1887	1899	South Brooklyn Railway	
South Brooklyn Railway	SBK		1900			Electric until 1961
South Brooklyn and Flatbush Railroad			1885	1887	South Brooklyn Railroad and Terminal Company	
South Side Railroad of Long Island		LI	1860	1874	Southern Railroad of Long Island	
Southern Railroad of Long Island		LI	1874	1880	Brooklyn and Montauk Railroad	
Southern Central Railroad		LV	1865	1895	Lehigh and New York Railroad	
Southern Hempstead Branch Railroad		LIRR	1875	1882	Stewart Railroad	
Southern New York Railroad			1888	1970	N/A	
Southern Westchester Railroad			1871	1872	New York, Housatonic and Northern Railroad	
Southfield Branch Railroad			1868	1894	N/A	
Springville and Sardinia Railroad			1878	1886	N/A	
Spuyten Duyvil and Port Morris Railroad		NYC	1867	1913	New York Central and Hudson River Railroad	
Staten Island Railroad	SIRC	B&O	1971	1991	N/A	
Staten Island Railroad		B&O	1851	1872	Staten Island Railway	
Staten Island Railway		B&O	1873	1944	Staten Island Rapid Transit Railway	
Staten Island Rapid Transit Railroad		B&O	1880	1899	Staten Island Rapid Transit Railway	
Staten Island Rapid Transit Railway	SIR	B&O	1899	1971	Staten Island Railroad	
Sterling Mountain Railway			1864	1955	N/A	
Stewart Railroad		LIRR	1873	1892	Long Island Rail Road	
Stony Clove and Catskill Mountain Railroad		NYC	1881	1901	Ulster and Delaware Railroad	
Suffern Railroad		ERIE	1907	1907	Erie and Jersey Railroad	
Suspension Bridge and Erie Junction Railroad		ERIE	1868	1896	Erie Railroad	
Syracuse and Baldwinsville Railroad		DL&W	1886	1891	Syracuse and Baldwinsville Railway	
Syracuse and Baldwinsville Railway		DL&W	1891		N/A	
Syracuse and Binghamton Railroad		DL&W	1851	1856	Syracuse and Southern Railroad	
Syracuse, Binghamton and New York Railroad		DL&W	1857	1945	Delaware, Lackawanna and Western Railroad	
Syracuse and Chenango Railroad		NYC	1873	1877	Syracuse, Chenango and New York Railroad	
Syracuse and Chenango Valley Railroad		NYC	1868	1873	Syracuse and Chenango Railroad	
Syracuse, Chenango and New York Railroad		NYC	1877	1883	Syracuse, Ontario and New York Railway	
Syracuse, Geneva and Corning Railway		NYC	1875	1909	Geneva, Corning and Southern Railroad	
Syracuse Junction Railroad		NYC	1873	1879	New York Central and Hudson River Railroad	
Syracuse Northern Railroad		NYC	1868	1875	Syracuse and Northern Railroad	
Syracuse and Northern Railroad		NYC	1875	1875	Rome, Watertown and Ogdensburg Railroad	
Syracuse Northwestern Railroad		NYC	1874	1875	Syracuse, Phoenix and Oswego Railroad	
Syracuse, Ontario and New York Railway		NYC	1883	1891	West Shore Railroad	
Syracuse, Phoenix and Oswego Railroad		NYC	1871	1885	Syracuse, Phoenix and Oswego Railway	
Syracuse, Phoenix and Oswego Railway		NYC	1885	1889	Rome, Watertown and Ogdensburg Railroad	
Syracuse and Southern Railroad		DL&W	1856	1857	Syracuse, Binghamton and New York Railroad	
Syracuse and Utica Railroad		NYC	1836	1853	New York Central Railroad	
Syracuse and Utica Direct Railroad		NYC	1853	1853	New York Central Railroad	
Terminal Railway of Buffalo		NYC	1895	1914	New York Central Railroad	
Ticonderoga Railroad		D&H	1889	1957	Delaware and Hudson Railroad	
Tioga Railroad		ERIE	1876	1885	New York, Lake Erie and Western Railroad	
Tioga Central Railroad	TIOC		1987	1992	Owego and Harford Railway	
Tioga Coal, Iron Mining and Manufacturing Company		NYC	1833	1851	Corning and Blossburg Railroad	
Tivoli Hollow Railroad		NYC	1893	1913	New York Central and Hudson River Railroad	
Tonawanda Railroad		NYC	1832	1850	Buffalo and Rochester Railroad	
Tonawanda Island Railroad	TIRL		1983	1996	N/A	
Tonawanda Island Bridge Company		NYC	1883	1913	New York Central and Hudson River Railroad	
Tonawanda Valley Railroad			1880	1881	Tonawanda Valley and Cuba Railroad	
Tonawanda Valley and Cuba Railroad			1881	1886	Attica and Freedom Railroad	
Tonawanda Valley Extension Railroad			1880	1881	Tonawanda Valley and Cuba Railroad	
Troy and Bennington Railroad		B&M	1851	1946	Boston and Maine Railroad	
Troy and Boston Railroad		B&M	1848	1887	Fitchburg Railroad	
Troy and Greenbush Railroad		NYC	1845	1976	Consolidated Rail Corporation	
Troy and Rutland Railroad		D&H	1849	1865	Troy, Salem and Rutland Railroad	
Troy, Salem and Rutland Railroad		D&H	1865	1868	Rensselaer and Saratoga Railroad	
Troy, Saratoga and Northern Railroad		B&M	1886	1892	Fitchburg Railroad	
Troy Union Railroad		B&M/ D&H/ NYC	1851	1964	N/A	
Tunesassa and Bradford Railroad			1905			
Ulster and Delaware Railroad		NYC	1875	1932	New York Central Railroad	
Unadilla Valley Railway	UV		1890	1960	N/A	
Union Railroad		ERIE	1851	1946	Erie Railroad	
Union Railroad		DL&W	1856	1858	Syracuse, Binghamton and New York Railroad	
Union Terminal Railroad of Buffalo		PRR	1884	1917	Western New York and Pennsylvania Railway	
Union Village and Johnsonville Railroad		D&H	1866	1874	Greenwich and Johnsonville Railroad	
United States and Canada Railroad		CN	1883	1960	Canadian National Railway	
Upper Hudson Railroad		B&M	1872	1872	Schuylerville and Upper Hudson Railroad	
Utica and Black River Railroad		NYC	1860	1913	New York Central and Hudson River Railroad	
Utica, Chenango and Cortland Railroad		DL&W	1870	1883	Erie and Central New York Railway	
Utica, Chenango and Susquehanna Valley Railway		DL&W	1866	1945	Delaware, Lackawanna and Western Railroad	
Utica City Railroad		NH	1862	1866	Utica and Waterville Railroad	
Utica, Clinton and Binghamton Railroad		NH	1868	1942	New York, Ontario and Western Railway	
Utica, Horseheads and Elmira Railroad		LV	1870	1871	Utica, Ithaca and Elmira Railroad	
Utica, Ithaca and Elmira Railroad		LV	1871	1878	Utica, Ithaca and Elmira Railway	
Utica, Ithaca and Elmira Railway		LV	1878	1884	Elmira, Cortland and Northern Railroad	
Utica and Schenectady Railroad		NYC	1833	1853	New York Central Railroad	
Utica and Unadilla Valley Railroad			1888	1895	Unadilla Valley Railway	
Utica and Waterville Railroad		NH	1866	1868	Utica, Clinton and Binghamton Railroad	
Valley Railroad		DL&W	1869	1945	Delaware, Lackawanna and Western Railroad	
Vermont and Canada Railroad		CN	1845	1891	Central Vermont Railroad	
Vermont Central Railroad		CN	1870	1873	Central Vermont Railroad	
Vermont Central Railroad		CN	1849	1855	N/A	Leased the Vermont and Canada Railroad
Wabash Railroad		WAB	1898	1915	Wabash Railway	
Wabash Railroad	WAB	WAB	1942	1964	Norfolk and Western Railway	
Wabash Railway		WAB	1915	1942	Wabash Railroad	
Wallkill Valley Railroad		NYC	1877	1952	New York Central Railroad	
Wallkill Valley Railway		NYC	1866	1877	Wallkill Valley Railroad	
Warwick Valley Railroad		L&HR	1860	1882	Lehigh and Hudson River Railway	
Watertown and Rome Railroad		NYC	1832	1861	Rome, Watertown and Ogdensburg Railroad	
Waverly and State Line Railway		LV	1867	1903	Lehigh Valley Railway	
Wellsville, Addison and Galeton Railroad	WAG		1954	1973	N/A	
Wellsville, Bradford and Eldred Railroad			1881	1893	N/A (operated by Bradford, Eldred and Cuba Railroad)	
Wellsville and Buffalo Railroad			1915	1916	N/A	
Wellsville, Coudersport and Pine Creek Railroad		B&O	1881	1954	Buffalo and Susquehanna Railroad	
West Brooklyn Railroad			1887	1889	N/A (operated by Brooklyn, Bath and West End Railroad)	
West Davenport Railroad		D&H	1891	1891	Cooperstown and Charlotte Valley Railroad	
West Shore Railroad		NYC	1885	1952	New York Central Railroad	
West Shore Hudson River Railroad		NYC	1867	1877	New York, West Shore and Chicago Railroad	
West Side and Yonkers Railway		NYC	1879	1887	New York City and Northern Railroad	
West Troy and Green Island Railroad		D&H	1870			
Westchester Railway			1881		N/A (never completed)	
Western New York Railway		PRR	1895	1895	Western New York and Pennsylvania Railway	
Western New York and Pennsylvania Railroad		PRR	1887	1895	Western New York and Pennsylvania Railway	
Western New York and Pennsylvania Railway		PRR	1895	1955	Penndel Company	
Western New York and Pennsylvania Railway of New York		PRR	1887	1887	Western New York and Pennsylvania Railroad	
Western Vermont Railroad		RUT	1845	1865	Bennington and Rutland Railroad	
Wharton Valley Railway		NH	1888	1942	N/A	
Whitehall and Plattsburgh Railroad		D&H	1866	1873	New York and Canada Railroad	
Whitestone and Westchester Railroad		LI	1871	1887	Long Island City and Flushing Railroad	
Williamsport and Elmira Railroad		PRR	1850	1860	Elmira and Williamsport Railroad	
Williamstown and Redfield Railroad			1865		N/A	
Windsor Beach and Ontario Railroad		NYC	1887	1888	Rome, Watertown and Ogdensburg Terminal Railroad	
Yonkers Rapid Transit Railway		NYC	1879	1887	New York and Northern Railway	

=== Street and electric railways ===
- Adirondack Lakes' Traction Company
- Albany and Hudson Railroad
- Albany and Hudson Railway and Power Company
- Albany Southern Railroad
- Amsterdam Street Railroad
- Atlantic Avenue Railroad
- Auburn and Northern Electric Railroad
- Auburn and Syracuse Electric Railroad
- Babylon Railroad
- Ballston Terminal Railroad
- Batavia Traction Company
- Belt Line Railway
- Bennington and North Adams Street Railway
- Berkshire Street Railway
- Binghamton Railway
- Black River Traction Company
- Bleecker Street and Fulton Ferry Railroad
- Bridge Operating Company
- Broadway Railroad
- Broadway Railway
- Broadway Ferry and Metropolitan Avenue Railroad
- Broadway and Seventh Avenue Railroad
- Bronx Traction Company
- Brooklyn Central Railroad
- Brooklyn Central and Jamaica Railroad
- Brooklyn City Railroad
- Brooklyn City and Newtown Railroad
- Brooklyn Crosstown Railroad
- Brooklyn Elevated Railroad
- Brooklyn Elevated Railway
- Brooklyn Elevated Silent Safety Railway
- Brooklyn Heights Railroad
- Brooklyn and Jamaica Railway
- Brooklyn–Manhattan Transit Corporation
- Brooklyn and North River Railroad
- Brooklyn, Queens County and Suburban Railroad
- Brooklyn Rapid Transit Company
- Brooklyn Union Elevated Railroad
- Buffalo City Railway
- Buffalo and Depew Railway
- Buffalo and Erie Railway
- Buffalo and Lake Erie Traction Company
- Buffalo, Lockport and Rochester Railway
- Buffalo Southern Railway
- Buffalo and Williamsville Electric Railway
- Bush Terminal Railroad
- Bushwick Railroad
- Calvary Cemetery, Greenpoint and Brooklyn Railroad
- Canarsie Railroad
- Catskill Electric Railway
- Cayadutta Electric Railroad
- Cedarhurst Railway
- Central City Rail Way
- Central Crosstown Railroad
- Central Park, North and East River Railroad
- Chautauqua Traction Company
- Christopher and Tenth Street Railroad
- City Island Railroad
- Cohoes Railway
- Coney Island and Brooklyn Railroad
- Coney Island Elevated Railway
- Coney Island, Fort Hamilton and Brooklyn Railroad
- Coney Island and Gravesend Railway
- Corning and Painted Post Street Railway
- Cortland County Traction Company
- Crosstown Street Railway of Buffalo
- DeKalb Avenue and North Beach Railroad
- DeKalb Avenue and North Brooklyn Railroad
- Dry Dock, East Broadway and Battery Railroad
- East River and Atlantic Ocean Railroad
- Eastern New York Railroad
- Echo Line Railroad
- Eighth Avenue Railroad
- Electric City Railway
- Elmira, Corning and Waverly Railway
- Elmira and Seneca Lake Traction Company
- Elmira Water, Light and Railroad Company
- Empire State Railroad
- Far Rockaway Railroad
- Fishkill Electric Railway
- Flushing and College Point Electric Railway
- Fonda, Johnstown and Gloversville Railroad
- Fort George and Eleventh Avenue Railroad
- Fort George Extension Railway
- Forty-second Street and Grand Street Ferry Railroad
- Forty-second Street, Manhattanville and St. Nicholas Avenue Railway
- Freeport Railroad
- Fulton Street Railroad
- Geneva, Seneca Falls and Auburn Railroad
- Geneva, Waterloo, Seneca Falls and Cayuga Lake Traction Company
- Gilbert Elevated Railway
- Glen Cove Railroad
- Gloversville Street Electric Railroad
- Grand Street and Newtown Railroad
- Great South Bay Ferry Company
- Greenbush and Nassau Electric Railway
- Greenpoint and Lorimer Street Railroad
- Greenwood and Coney Island Railroad
- Harlem Bridge, Morrisania and Fordham Railway
- Hornell Traction Company
  - Hornellsville and Canisteo Railway
  - Hornellsville Electric Railway
- Houston, West Street and Pavonia Ferry Railroad
- Hudson Light and Power and Railroad Company
- Hudson and Manhattan Railroad
- Hudson River and Eastern Traction Company
- Hudson Street Railway
- Hudson Tunnel Railway
- Hudson Valley Railway
- Huntington Railroad
- Independent City Owned Rapid Transit Railroad
- Interborough Rapid Transit Company
- International Railway
- Ithaca Street Railway
- Ithaca Traction Corporation
- Jamaica and Brooklyn Railroad
- Jamaica and Brooklyn Road Company
- Jamaica Central Railways
- Jamestown Street Railway
- Jamestown, Westfield and Northwestern Railroad
- Jerome Park Railway
- Johnstown, Gloversville and Kingsboro Horse Railroad
- Kaydeross Railroad
- Keeseville, Ausable Chasm and Lake Champlain Railroad
- Kings County Electric Railway
- Kings County Elevated Railway
- Kingsbridge Railway
- Kingston Consolidated Railroad
- Long Beach Marine Railway
- Long Island City and Newtown Railroad
- Long Island Electric Railway
- Long Island Traction Company
- Manhattan Railway Company
- Manhattan Bridge Three Cent Line
- Manhattan and Queens Traction Company
- Manhattan and Queens Traction Corporation
- Marine Railway
- Melrose and West Morrisania Railroad
- Metropolitan Crosstown Railway
- Metropolitan Elevated Railway
- Metropolitan Street Railway
- Mid-Crosstown Railway
- Mineola, Hempstead and Freeport Traction Company
- Mineola, Roslyn and Port Washington Traction Company
- Mount Beacon-on-Hudson Association
- Mount Vernon and Eastchester Railway
- Nassau Railroad
- Nassau County Railway
- Nassau Electric Railroad
- New Paltz, Highland and Poughkeepsie Traction Company
- New Rochelle Railway and Transit Company
- New Williamsburgh and Flatbush Railroad
- New York Railways
- New York, Auburn and Lansing Railroad
- New York City Railway
- New York City Interborough Railway
- New York and Coney Island Railroad
- New York Consolidated Railroad
- New York Elevated Railroad
- New York, Fordham and Bronx Railway
- New York and Harlem Railroad
- New York and Jersey Railroad
- New York and Long Island Traction Company
- New York Municipal Railway
- New York and North Shore Railway
- New York and North Shore Traction Company
- New York and Queens County Railway
- New York and Stamford Railway
- New York State Railways
- New York, Westchester and Connecticut Traction Company
- Newark and Marion Railway
- Newtown Railway
- Niagara Gorge Railroad
- Ninth Avenue Railroad
- North and East River Railway
- North End Street Railway
- North Third Avenue and Fleetwood Park Railroad
- Northport Traction Company
- Ocean Electric Railway
- Ogdensburg Street Railway
- One Hundred and Forty-fifth Street Crosstown Railroad
- Oneida Railway
- Oneonta and Mohawk Valley Railroad
- Orange County Traction Company
- Park Avenue Railroad
- Paul Smith's Electric Light and Power and Railroad Company
- Peekskill Lighting and Railroad Company
- Pelham Park Railroad
- Pelham Park and City Island Railway
- Penn Yan, Keuka Park and Branchport Railway
- Penn Yan and Lake Shore Railway
- Plattsburgh Traction Company
- Port Jervis Electric Light, Power, Gas and Railroad Company
- Port Jervis Traction Company
- Poughkeepsie City and Wappingers Falls Electric Railway
- Poughkeepsie and Wappingers Falls Railway
- Prospect Park and Coney Island Railroad
- Prospect Park and South Brooklyn Railroad
- Putnam and Westchester Traction Company
- Queens Railway
- Queensboro Bridge Railway Company
- Richmond County Railroad
- Richmond Light and Railroad Company
- Richmond Street Railway
- Rochester Railway Company
- Rochester and Eastern Rapid Railway
- Rochester, Lockport and Buffalo Railroad
- Rochester and Manitou Railroad
- Rochester and Sodus Bay Railway
- Rochester and Suburban Railway
- Rochester Subway (RSB)
- Rochester and Syracuse Railroad
- Rochester, Syracuse and Eastern Railroad
- Rockaway Village Railroad
- St. Lawrence International Electric Railroad and Land Company
- Schenectady Railway
- Sea Beach Railway
- Sea View Railroad
- Seashore Municipal Railroad
- Second Avenue Railroad
- Sixth Avenue Railroad
- Soundview Transportation Company
- South Brooklyn Street Railroad
- South Ferry Railroad
- South Shore Traction Company
- Southern Boulevard Railroad
- Southern New York Railway
- Southern New York Power and Railway Corporation
- Southfield Beach Railroad
- Staten Island Electric Railroad
- Staten Island Horse Railroad
- Staten Island Midland Railroad
- Staten Island Midland Railway
- Staten Island Traction Company
- Suburban Rapid Transit Company
- Suburban Traction Company
- Suffolk Traction Company
- Syracuse, Lake Shore and Northern Railroad
- Syracuse Northern Electric Railway
- Syracuse Rapid Transit Railway
- Syracuse and South Bay Electric Railroad
- Syracuse and Suburban Railroad
- Tarrytown, White Plains and Mamaroneck Railway
- Third Avenue Railroad
- Third Avenue Railway
- Third Avenue Bridge Company
- Thirty-fourth Street Railroad
- Thirty-fourth Street Crosstown Railway
- Thirty-fourth Street Ferry and Eleventh Avenue Railroad
- Troy and New England Railway
- Twenty-eighth and Thirtieth Streets Crosstown Railroad
- Twenty-eighth and Twenty-ninth Streets Crosstown Railroad
- Twenty-third Street Railway
- Union Railroad
- Union Railway of New York City
- United Railroad
- United Traction Company
- Utica Belt Line Street Railroad
- Utica and Mohawk Valley Railway
- Van Brunt Street and Erie Basin Railroad
- Van Nest, West Farms and Westchester Traction Company
- Wakefield and Westchester Traction Company
- Wallkill Transit Company
- Warren and Jamestown Street Railway
- Washington Street and State Asylum Railroad
- Waverly, Sayre and Athens Traction Company
- West Farms and Westchester Traction Company
- West Side and Yonkers Patent Railway
- Westchester Electric Railroad
- Westchester Street Railroad
- Western New York and Pennsylvania Traction Company
- Williamsbridge and Westchester Traction Company
- Yonkers Railroad

=== Other passenger carriers ===
- Niagara and Western New York Railroad
- OnTrack
- Prospect Park Incline Railway

=== Private carriers ===
- Crown Point Iron Company's Railroad
- Fulton Chain Railroad
- Marion River Carry Railroad
- Peekskill Iron Company

=== Not completed ===
- Dunderberg Spiral Railway
- New England and Oswego Railroad
- New York and Boston Rapid Transit Company
- Ogdensburg, Clayton and Rome Railroad
- Portland, Rutland, Oswego and Chicago Railroad
