= Syracuse Northern Electric Railway =

Overview
- Locale: Syracuse, New York, to Oswego, New York
- Dates of operation: 1917–1931

Technical
- Track gauge: 4 ft 8 1/2 in (1,435 mm) standard gauge

The Syracuse Northern Electric Railway, also known as the Syracuse and Northern Electric Railway, was an interurban rail that ran from Syracuse, New York, to Oswego, New York, a distance of 35.5 miles (57.1 km). The line also proceeded to South Bay, New York, on Oneida Lake.

The rail was formerly the Syracuse and South Bay Railway Company and the name was changed in 1917.
