= Geneva and Lyons Railroad =

Defunct railroad in the United States

Map

The Geneva and Lyons Railroad was a railroad in New York State, constructed and owned by the New York Central Railroad. Chartered in 1877 and opened in 1878, it served as an outlet for coal trains on the Syracuse, Geneva and Corning Railway to reach the main line of the New York Central. The Fall Brook Coal Company, which operated the Syracuse, Geneva and Corning, and the Lehigh Valley Railroad both used the line to deliver coal to Lyons. A branch of the New York Central since its completion, the Geneva and Lyons was formally absorbed by the New York Central in 1890.

== History ==
Chartered on October 5, 1877, the Geneva and Lyons was built to improve the connections between the New York Central and the Syracuse, Geneva and Corning Railroad. The latter line was leased by the Fall Brook Coal Company, a major supplier of coal to the New York Central. The Fall Brook already connected to the Auburn Road of the New York Central at Geneva, but the new railroad allowed trains to run through Geneva directly to the main line of the New York Central at Lyons. This allowed the rerouting of coal traffic which was overloading the single track of the Auburn Road.

Construction of the Geneva and Lyons was underway by the spring of 1878. The first passenger train over the railroad ran on November 11, 1878, and was operated by the Fall Brook, continuing south to Corning. While the new railroad was owned and operated by the New York Central, which had advanced the funds for its construction, the Fall Brook continued to operate trains over the Geneva and Lyons and the Northern Central Railway also arranged for trackage rights over the railroad in 1878. George J. Magee, of the Fall Brook, was also a director of the Geneva and Lyons.

Coal trestles or chutes were built for the New York Central's locomotives at Lyons, and in August 1879, 1,000 short tons (890 long tons) of coal per day were shipped over the Geneva and Lyons to the trestles there. About 400 short tons (360 long tons) were used to fuel locomotives at Lyons and the remainder shipped elsewhere on the New York Central system. By 1886, this amount had increased to 230,000 short tons (210,000 long tons) in a month, both bituminous coal from the Fall Brook's mines and anthracite from connections southward. At the time, it was reported that the Lehigh Valley Railroad, was also running over the Geneva and Lyons to deliver coal. In January 1887, the coal shipments had increased again, to 22,000 short tons (20,000 long tons) daily. In August 1881, work began to double-track the line. By April 1882, the double track had been finished from Geneva to Bennett's and from Lyons to Thompson's. However, the complete double-tracking was still unfinished in 1893. 12.67 miles (20.39 km) of the line, which totaled 14.08 miles (22.66 km), had been double-tracked as of 1914.

The Geneva and Lyons was absorbed by the New York Central, which had operated it as a branch. The line was leased by the Fall Brook in 1893, but was itself taken over by the New York Central in 1899.
