= Bombay and Moira Railroad =

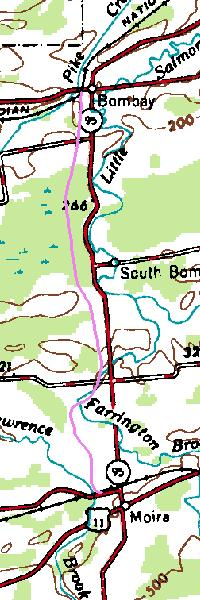
- Bombay and Moira system map.

Overview
- Locale: Moira, New York
- Dates of operation: 1888–1900

Technical
- Track gauge: 4 ft 8 1/2 in (1,435 mm) standard gauge

The Bombay and Moira Railroad is a historic railroad in New York.

The Saratoga and St. Lawrence Railroad began operations on December 27, 1888 on a line running from Moira to Bombay. The S&SL was reincorporated on March 31, 1898 as the Bombay and Moira Railroad.

The B&M was abandoned in 1900 after being purchased by the Grand Trunk Railway and torn up for scrap.

The right-of-way is still visible due to lack of property development and encroaching vegetation.
