= Syracuse Junction Railroad =

Overview
- Locale: Syracuse, New York to Utica, New York
- Dates of operation: 1873–1879
- Successor: New York Central Railroad

Technical
- Track gauge: 4 ft 8 1/2 in (1,435 mm) standard gauge

The Syracuse Junction Railroad, established in 1873 and opened in 1874, was built to route two freight tracks of a four-track system around Syracuse, New York.

== History ==
Syracuse Junction Railroad was established on June 9, 1873, by the New York Central and Hudson River Railroad Company. The line opened for business on November 16, 1874. It was leased back to the New York Central and Hudson River Railroad Company on April 10, 1875, as a legal formality and changed to the New York Central Railroad in 1914.

By 1950, the line was still in use and routed through the Carrier Corporation plant in Syracuse where air conditioners were loaded and shipped.
