= Silver Creek and Dunkirk Railway =

Overview
- Dates of operation: 1890–1894
- Successor: Lake Shore and Michigan Southern Railway

Technical
- Track gauge: 1,435 mm (4 ft 8 1/2 in)
- Length: 8.71 miles (14.02 km)

The Silver Creek and Dunkirk Railway was a railway company in the United States. It was established in 1890 by the Lake Shore and Michigan Southern Railway to relocate that company's main line between Dunkirk, New York, and Silver Creek, New York, a distance of approximately 8 miles (13 km). On the completion of the new line in 1892, the LS&MS's original route was leased to the Nickel Plate Road. The line remains part of CSX's Erie West Subdivision.

== History ==
The Buffalo and State Line Railroad completed a line between Buffalo, New York, and the New York/Pennsylvania state line in 1849. This line ran through both Dunkirk, New York, and Silver Creek, New York. At the Pennsylvania border it connected with the Cleveland, Painesville and Ashtabula Railroad. Both eventually became part of the Lake Shore and Michigan Southern Railway (LS&MS), whose main line ran between Buffalo and Chicago via Toledo, Ohio, and Adrian, Michigan. The LS&MS was one of several railroads controlled by the Vanderbilt family which eventually became the New York Central Railroad system.

The Nickel Plate Road was built as a competitor to the LS&MS and began operation on October 23, 1882. Publicly scornful of the enterprise before it opened, William Henry Vanderbilt bought out the original owners and took control of the Nickel Plate at the beginning of 1883. The two railroads were operated in parallel, but to the detriment of the Nickel Plate.

The LS&MS incorporated the Silver Creek and Dunkirk Railway on November 11, 1890. The new line between the two namesake places opened in 1892, and the company merged with the parent on June 29, 1894. That done, the LS&MS leased the original line to the Nickel Plate Road, allowing it to abandon its original parallel line. Control of the Nickel Plate passed to the Van Sweringen brothers in 1916, and the Nickel Plate bought the 7.84-mile (12.62 km) line outright in 1923.

== Route ==
The two lines continue to run roughly parallel between Dunkirk and Silver Creek, less than 1 mile (1.6 km) apart at their widest. Following various mergers and acquisitions, the northernmost of the two, built by the Silver Creek and Dunkirk Railway, is part of the CSX Erie West Subdivision. To the south, the ex-Nickel Plate line, originally built by the Buffalo and State Line Railroad, is part of the Norfolk Southern Railway's Lake Erie District.
