= Peekskill Valley Railroad =

Rail line in New York

Coordinates: 41.31849°N 73.91632°W

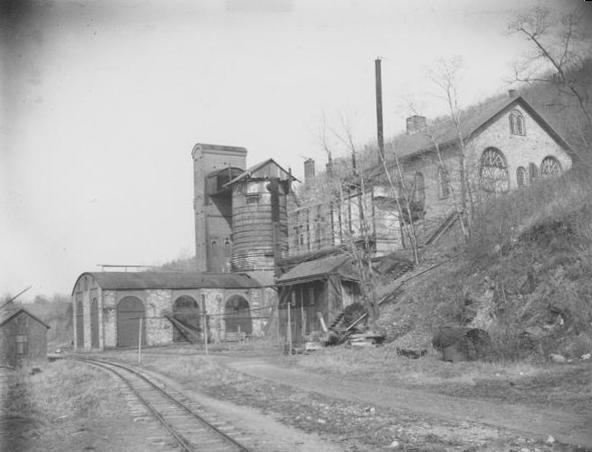
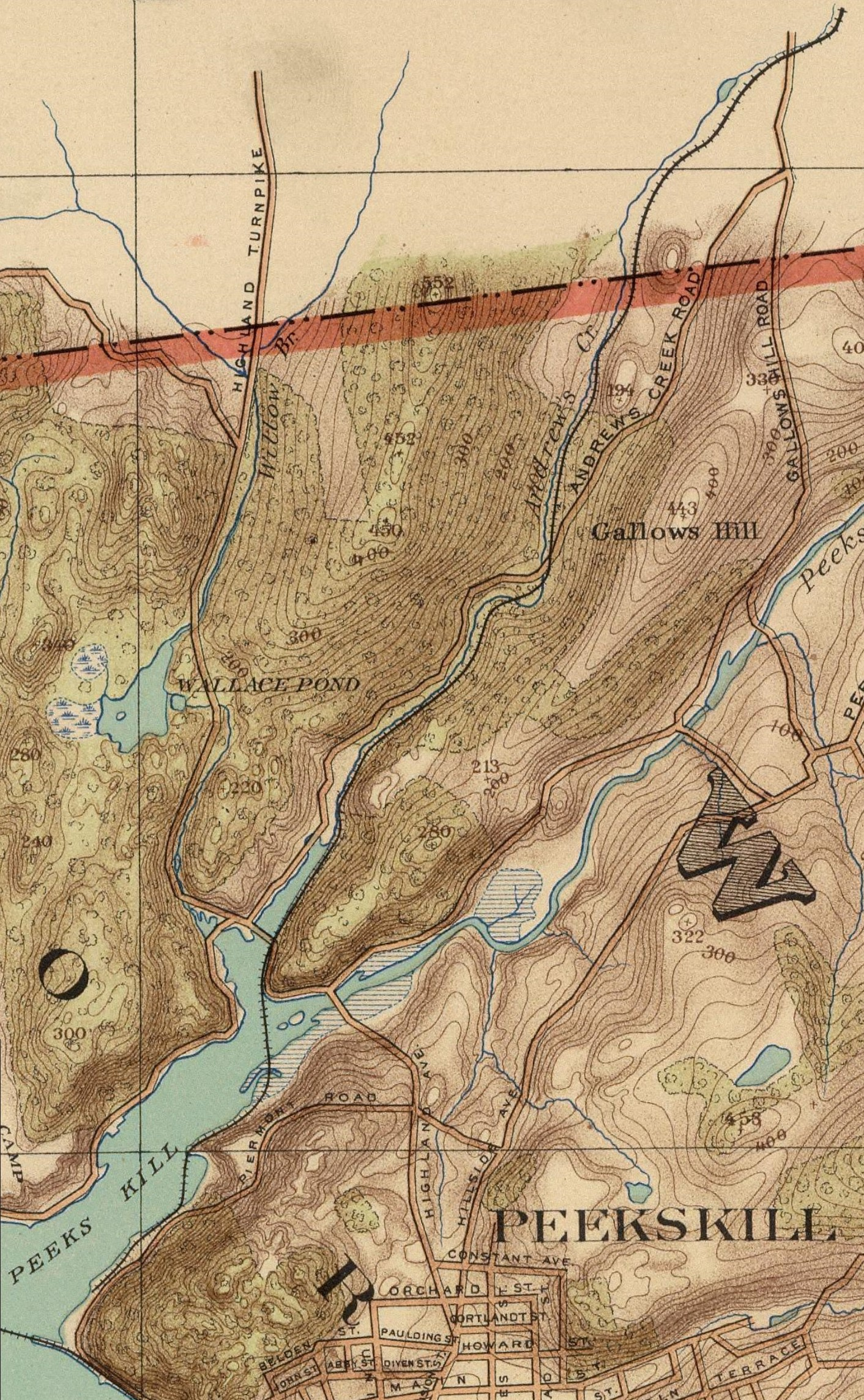
- Peekskill Iron Works in Peekskill, New York Peekskill Valley Railroad on map by Cornelius Clarkson Vermeule, 1891

Technical
- Line length: 7 miles (11.3 km)
- Track gauge: 2 ft (610 mm)

The Peekskill Valley Railroad was a 7 miles (11.3 km) long narrow gauge railroad in Peekskill, New York. It was inaugurated in 1873.

== History ==
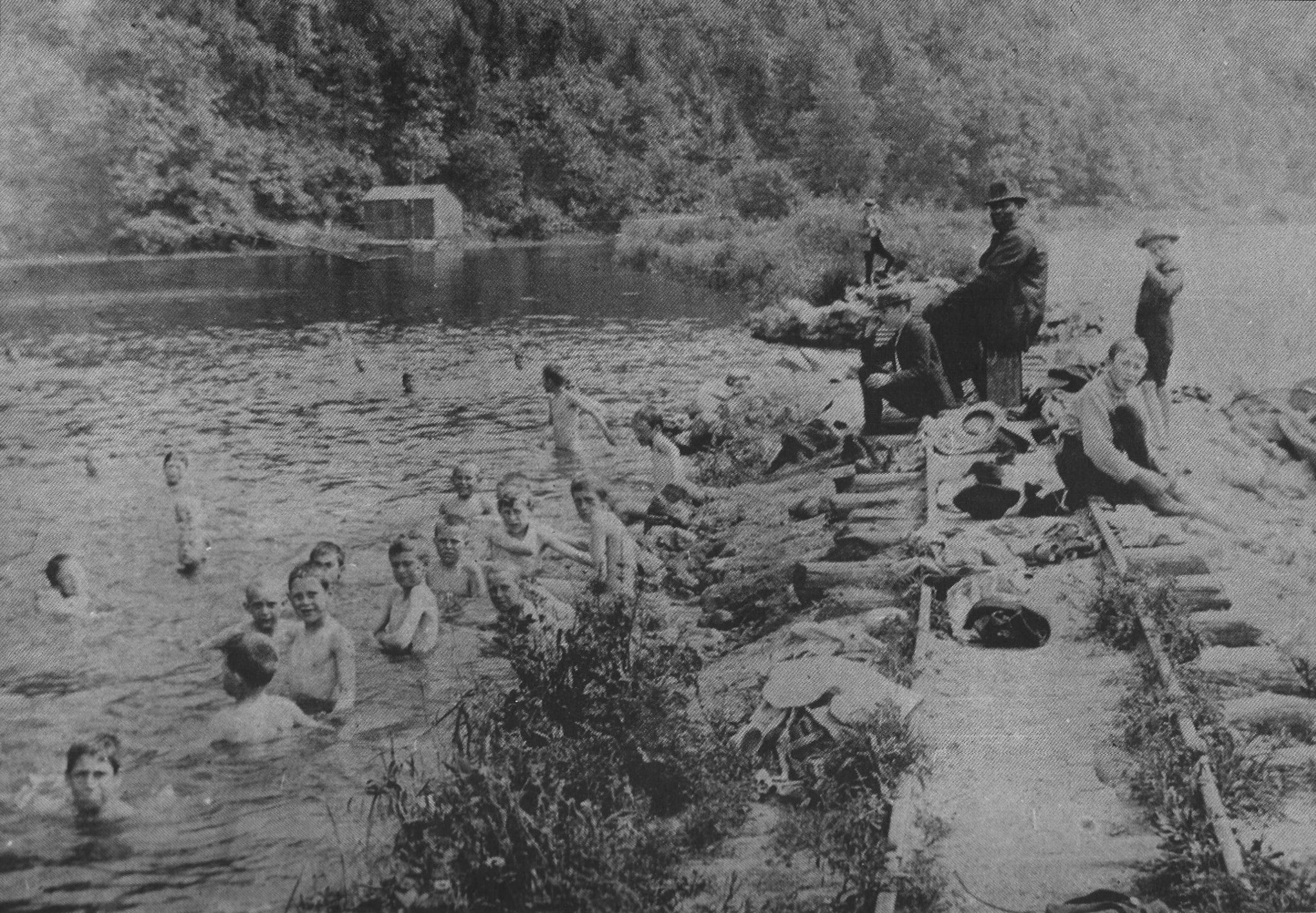
'Uncle Abram' Hallenback supervises swimming kids at Annsville Creek near Peekskill

The Peekskill Valley Railroad was built by the Peekskill Iron Company in 1873, from their furnaces, at Peekskill, Westchester county, to a point on the Hudson River Railroad, over a distance of seven miles. The gauge of this railway was 2 ft (610 mm), and was at its time of construction the narrowest freight carrier in the USA.

According to other sources, high grade iron ore from the Croft or Indian Lake Mines was extracted and transported by narrow gauge railway down Canopus Valley to the Peekskill Blast Furnace of the Empire State Iron Works at Annsville Creek from 1878 to 1887. The mine was abandoned in 1887 and the tracks removed for salvage in 1910.

The superstructure and equipment was very light. The weight of the locomotive was four tons.

== See also ==
- Peekskill Lighting and Railroad Company
