= Ithaca, Auburn and Western Railroad =

Overview
- Locale: New York
- Dates of operation: 1876–1891
- Successor: Auburn and Ithaca Railway

Technical
- Track gauge: 4 ft 8 1/2 in (1,435 mm) standard gauge

The Ithaca, Auburn and Western Railroad was a short-lived railroad connecting Ithaca and Auburn.

In 1876, it bought part of the New York and Oswego Midland Railroad's Auburn Branch, extending from Freeville on the Utica, Ithaca and Elmira Railroad to Scipio, and was operated by the UI&E. It subsequently extended the line north from Scipio to Auburn. In 1883, it was leased by the Southern Central Railroad (a subsidiary of the Lehigh Valley Railroad), whose route it paralleled. On November 2, 1889, the line between Auburn and Dougal Road was bought at foreclosure by the Lehigh Valley subsidiary Auburn and Ithaca Railway, which built a line diverging from the IA&W at Genoa Junction (just west of Auburn) to Cayuga Junction on the Geneva and Sayre Railroad, another subsidiary. The rest of the line, however, was redundant to the Southern Central, and passed through sparsely settled and unprofitable country. It was abandoned in 1891.

The grade from a point south of Genoa Junction to South Lansing was re-used by the Ithaca-Auburn Short Line, which was itself abandoned in 1923. The small portion preserved by the Lehigh Valley was abandoned in 1971. The grade from Genoa Junction to Mapleton is now a power line right-of-way.
