= Jamestown, Westfield and Northwestern Railroad =

Railway in New York

Overview
- Headquarters: Jamestown, New York
- Reporting mark: JW&NW
- Locale: Jamestown, New York and Westfield, New York
- Dates of operation: 1914–1950

Technical
- Track gauge: 4 ft 8 1/2 in (1,435 mm) standard gauge

The Jamestown, Westfield and Northwestern Railroad (JW&NW) was an electric interurban railroad that served the New York towns of Jamestown and Westfield from 1914 to 1950.

== History ==
Dubbed the "Chautauqua Lake Route", the single track 32-mile (51 km) electrified JW&NW railroad provided passenger service and freight shipments between the furniture manufacturing city of Jamestown and the Lake Erie town of Westfield. It connected with the New York Central Railroad at the NYC's Westfield depot in Westfield. This passenger and freight exchange with the New York Central Railroad was the crux of JW&NW's offering, with the greatest passenger and freight business in the 1920s. As road and car use increased, passenger ridership decreased. Further, furniture manufacturing in Jamestown diminished, providing less economic need for the JW&NW railroad. It was abandoned in 1950.

== Route and rail operations ==
=== Route ===
From Jamestown, the route traveled west along the north side of Chautauqua Lake with stops at Greenhurst, Bemus Point, Dewittville, and Mayville. Mayville is on the north side of the lake; Jamestown, on the south. The other towns were along the east side of the lake. In the final decades of the JWNW, Mayville was the closest rail point proximate to the resort town of Chautauqua. After crossing the Pennsylvania Railroad's (PRR) Chautauqua Branch at Mayville, the line climbed a steep grade through low hills, passed through scenic "Hogsback Ravine" at the grade's summit, then dropped along a curvy route to Westfield. At Westfield, it passed under the Nickel Plate Railroad then turned sharply east adjacent to the New York Central Railroad to arrive at their combined depot.

=== Schedule ===
A JW&NW schedule from 1941 shows six daily trips from 6am to 9pm, each way, operating three hours apart, to meet NYC passenger trains that stopped at Westfield. The trip to Jamestown took one hour. The JW&NW and the NYC interchanged considerable carload freight as well as passengers.

=== Passenger equipment ===
The JW&NW operated bright red heavy steel passenger interurban cars (including one with an observation platform) and General Electric and Westinghouse electric freight motors capable of pulling two to three freight cars up to Hogsback summit. The NYC would set freight cars on the Westfield interchange tracks to be taken to Jamestown by the JW&NW. The JW&NW would bring cars for the NYC to pick up. Wood and other materials necessary for furniture manufacturing went to Jamestown. Finished furniture moved to Westfield to be picked up by the New York Central.

=== Other freight interchange ===
At Mayville, the JW&NW crossed a branch of the Pennsylvania Railroad where interchange tracks allowed PRR lumber and coal setouts to route to Jamestown. The JW&NW dispatcher and tower were at this junction. PRR and JW&NW crossing control and signaling to prevent collisions (called interlocking) was the responsibility of the JW&NW. Dispatching orders for the conductors on board the interurban coaches was by written train order, and the interurbans stopped here to pick them up. In a 1941 ad, the line offered two-day LCL (Less-than-carload freight) shipping to New York City from Jamestown, and three days to Chicago.

=== Operation ===
The grade from Westfield south into the hills heading toward Jamestown was very scenic, particularly where it passed through Hogsback Ravine. The grade was steep, and the interurban cars worked hard on the climb, particularly the electric powered freights. The 32-mile JW&NW represented classic small town-to-rural electric interurban operation similar to interurban lines all over the 1920s United States. The large red coaches lumbering by at grade crossings were a familiar sight for years at Chautauqua valley villages. Most interurban lines were abandoned during the 1930s due to increased car ownership and improving highways as well as the financial impact of the Great Depression. The JW&NW's passenger survival to 1947 and its freight survival to 1950 was due to its freight transfer with the New York Central for the many Jamestown factories.

The H.E. Salzberg Company operated the company since at least late 1943 and the Interstate Commerce Commission approved its control of the JW&NW through ownership of stock in April 1945.

=== Decline and abandonment ===
After passenger abandonment in 1947, the JW&NW continued freight operation with diesels, but gradually freight business declined along with Jamestown's industrial activity which for years had been primarily the manufacture of furniture. Shipping business also was lost to trucks. Total abandonment occurred in 1950.

== Also see ==
1) Video of JW&NW freight and express transfers at the NYC station at Westfield: www.youtube.com/watch?v=7_TBiX-VcVA 2) Video of JW&NW operating between Jamestown and Westfield: https://www.youtube.com/watch?v=XG_Jp7egB88
