= Utica, Clinton and Binghamton Railroad =

Railway in New York, United States

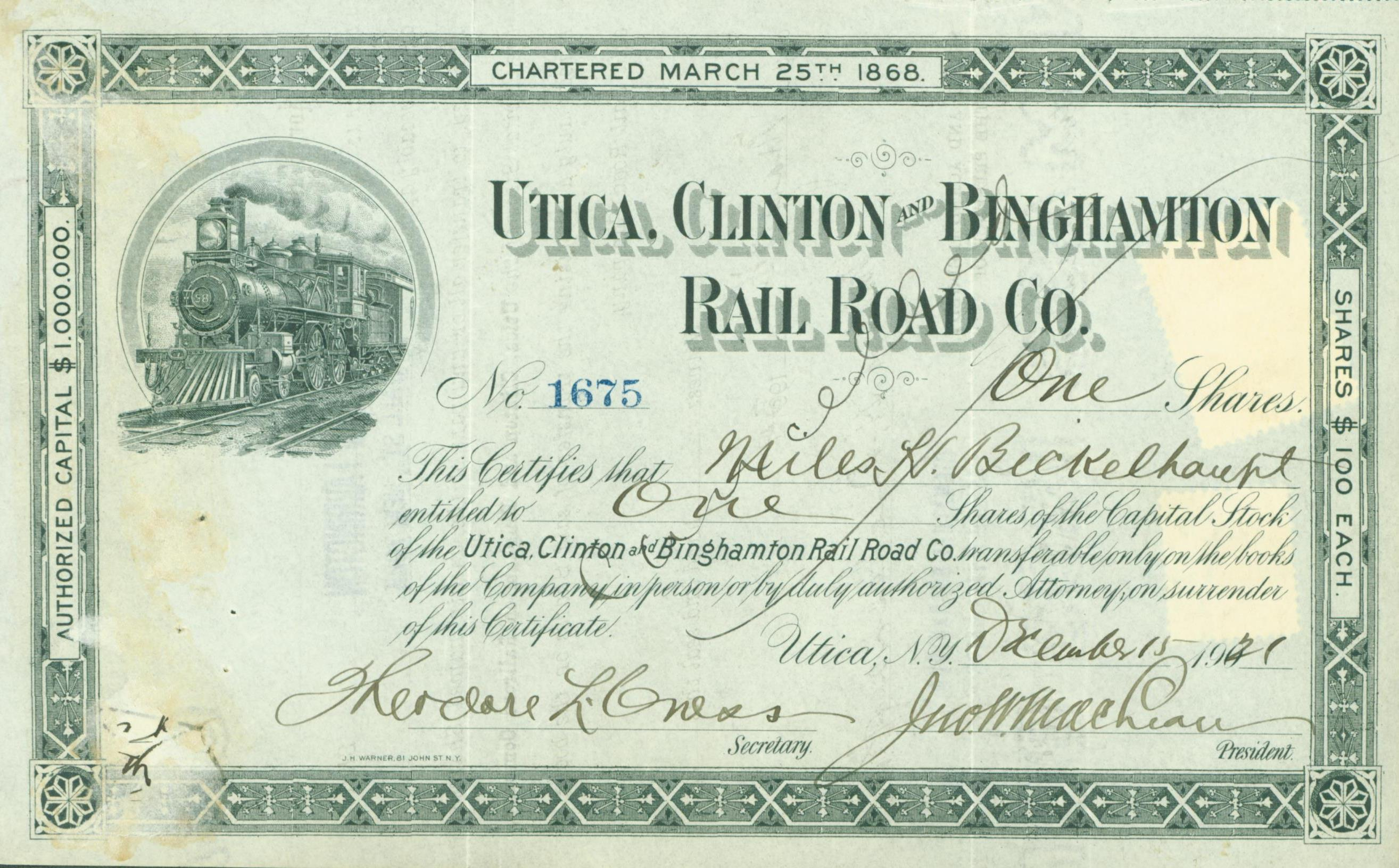
Share of the Utica, Clinton and Binghamton Rail Road Company, issued 15. December 1921

The Utica, Clinton and Binghamton Railroad was a railroad in the state of New York. It was leased by the New York and Oswego Midland Railroad as a branch line in connection with the Rome and Clinton Railroad. After a few years under the Delaware and Hudson Company, it returned to the New York, Ontario and Western Railway system in 1886 and was known by its nickname, "The Peanut". It was later abandoned in 1942.
