= Schenectady and Duanesburgh Railroad =

Map

The Schenectady and Duanesburgh Railroad, incorporated in July 1873, was a predecessor of the Delaware and Hudson Railway that owned the 14.2-mile (22.9 km) line between the Saratoga and Schenectady Railroad at Schenectady and the Albany and Susquehanna Railroad at Delanson. It was incorporated on December 27, 1869, as the Schenectady and Susquehanna Railroad, and opened in about August 1872, always leased to the Delaware and Hudson Canal Company. The property was sold under foreclosure on July 10, 1873, and conveyed to the Schenectady and Duanesburgh Railroad on July 12. The company was merged into the Delaware and Hudson Company on August 4, 1903.
