= Fulton Chain Railway =

Map

The Fulton Chain Railway was incorporated as the Fulton Chain Railroad in 1896, and opened that year. After reorganization in 1902, the company, then operated by the New York Central Railroad, was renamed the Fulton Chain Railway. The line, also known as the Old Forge Branch, was 2.204 miles (3.547 km) long, and connected Fulton Chain to Old Forge, where Fulton Navigation Company ships made connections. The New York Central gained control of the company in 1917, and operated its line until July 11, 1932. A short stub at the Fulton Chain end remained the property of the company until January 1, 1937, when the Fulton Chain Railway was merged into the New York Central.
