= Middlesex Valley Railroad =

The Middlesex Valley Railroad was formed in 1892 to build a railroad from Geneva about 30 miles to Naples. The Geneva and Southwestern Railroad was incorporated to build along this route more than 20 years earlier but only got as far as grading the route. The line was completed in 1894 and the following year the Middlesex Valley was acquired by the Lehigh Valley Railroad. The Middlesex Valley operated independently until 1903 when it became the Naples Branch of the Lehigh Valley.
