= Rome and Clinton Railroad =

The Rome and Clinton Railroad was an American railroad connecting Rome, New York with Clinton, New York. It was built by Willis Phelps & Company in 1871, initially as a coal route and leased by the New York and Oswego Midland Railroad as a branch line in connection with the Utica, Clinton and Binghamton Railroad. After a few years under the Delaware and Hudson Company, it returned to the New York, Ontario and Western Railway system in 1886. This branch line was nicknamed "The Peanut", and was abandoned in 1932.
