= Dansville and Mount Morris Railroad =

Dansville and Mount Morris

Overview
- Headquarters: Rochester, New York
- Reporting mark: DMM
- Locale: New York
- Dates of operation: 1868–present

Technical
- Track gauge: 4 ft 8 1/2 in (1,435 mm) standard gauge

The Dansville and Mount Morris Railroad (reporting mark DMM) is a short line railroad located in Dansville, New York.

The Dansville and Mount Morris Railroad first opened in the 1870s. It extended the entire length from Dansville to Mount Morris, New York.

The line operated independently until the July 23, 1985 purchase by Genesee & Wyoming Inc. It is now operated as part of the Rochester and Southern Railroad, but still exists as a non-operating subsidiary of Genesee and Wyoming.
