= Skaneateles Short Line Railroad =

Railroad in New York, United States

Map

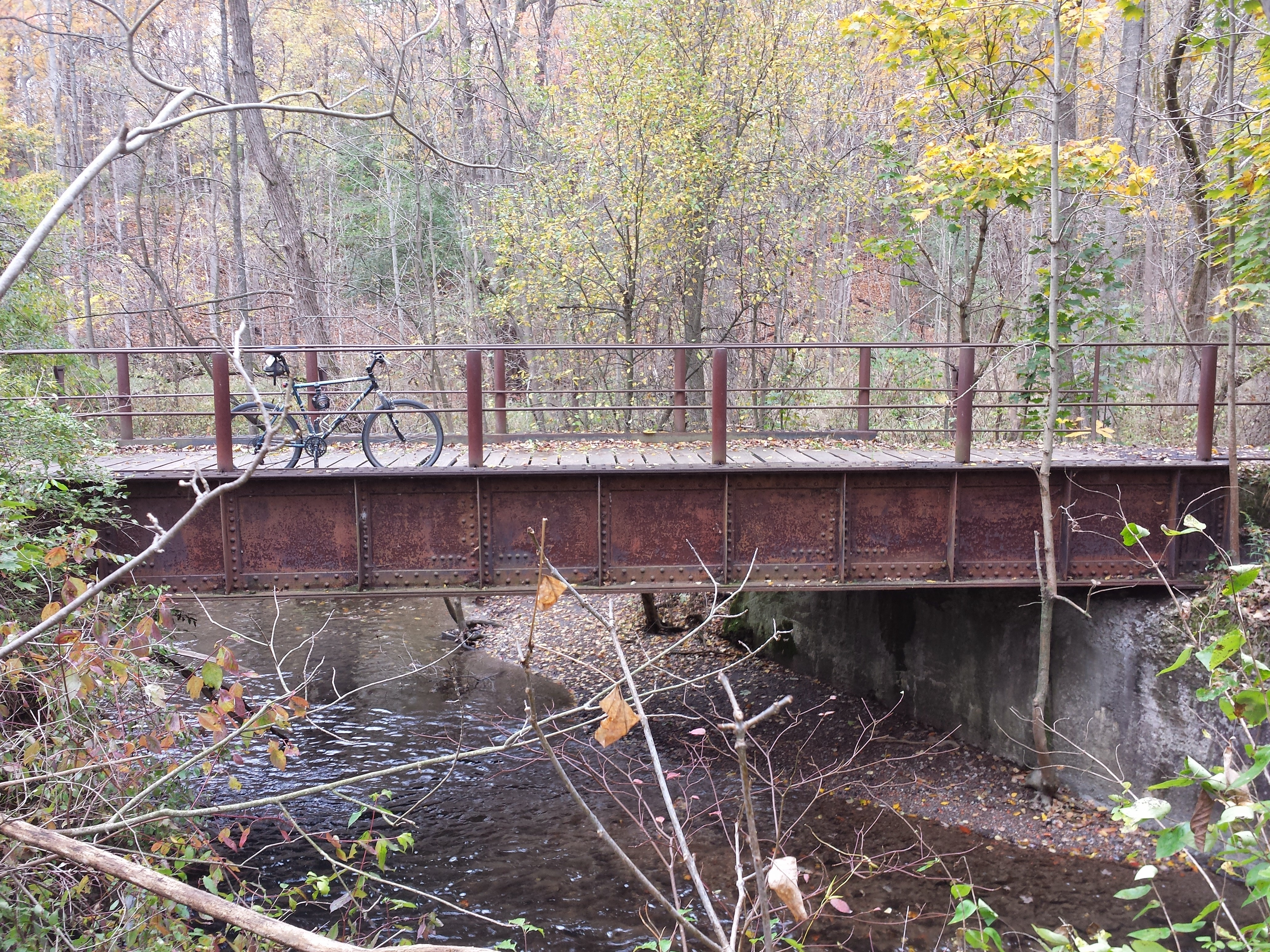
Part of the former right-of-way of the Skaneateles Short Line Railroad is now a rail trail

The Skaneateles Short Line Railroad was a railroad that operated between Skaneateles Junction, New York and Skaneateles, New York under several slightly different names from 1840 until 1981.

== History ==
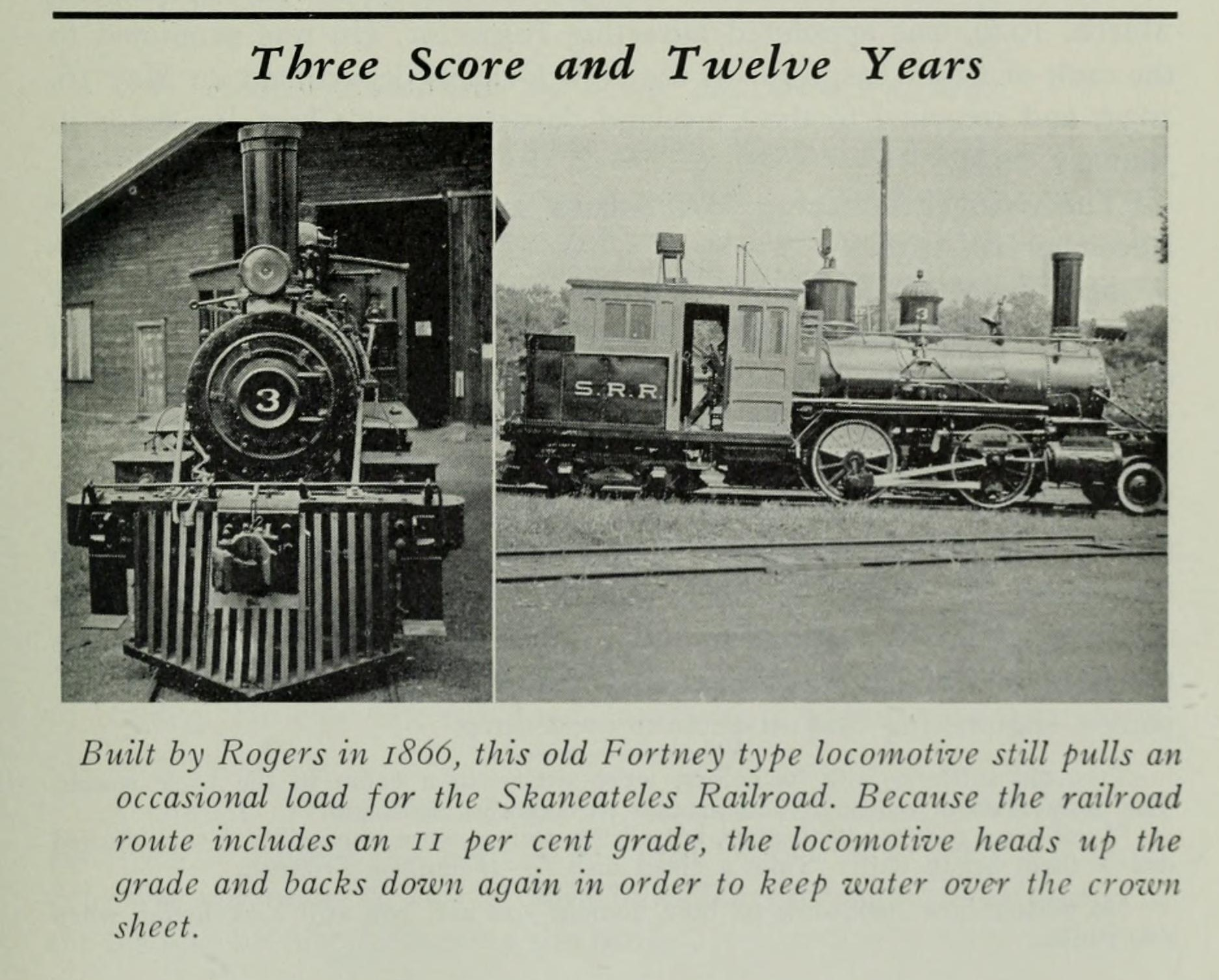
An 1866-vintage locomotive was still used on the line in 1939.

The original Skaneateles Railroad was chartered in 1836 to build a connection from Skaneateles to the Auburn and Syracuse Railroad, a forerunner of the New York Central Railroad, which had bypassed the village. This railroad opened on September 30, 1840. It was a comparatively primitive affair, with wooden rails and horse-drawn trains. The company failed and went bankrupt on August 24, 1850. The tracks were abandoned; the wooden rails were repurposed as building materials.

Following the Civil War locals revived the idea of a railroad, led by Joel Thayer. The second Skaneateles Railroad was incorporated on April 17, 1866, and opened on October 1, 1867. Like its predecessor, it ran 5 miles (8.0 km) north from Skaneateles and connected with the New York Central (as it now was) at Skaneateles Junction. The railroad saw substantial tourist traffic bound for Skaneateles Lake and beginning in 1871 owned an interest in the steamboat operations on the lake. It later owned and operated several boats of its own before selling the business to the Auburn and Syracuse Electric Railroad. Freight and passenger business slumped in the 1920s. Passenger service ended altogether in 1932. The closure of the US Gypsum plant in Skaneateles Falls led the company to abandon operations on February 7, 1940.

Again, local citizens revived the railroad, this time as the Skaneateles Short Line Railroad. The new company was incorporated on October 15, 1940, and began operations on April 17, 1941. The company dieselized in 1950, acquiring a GE 44-ton and GE 45-ton switchers. The closure of a mill in Skaneateles in 1969 led the railroad to abandon the track between the village and Skaneateles Falls, a distance of 3 miles (4.8 km). This left the Stauffer Chemical Company as the railroad's sole customer. In 1974 Stauffer acquired the railroad. The railroad discontinued operations on July 15, 1981, and was later abandoned. Portions of the former right-of-way are part of the Charlie Major Nature Trail.
