= New York and Brighton Beach Railway =

Coordinates: 40.575437°N 73.959450°W

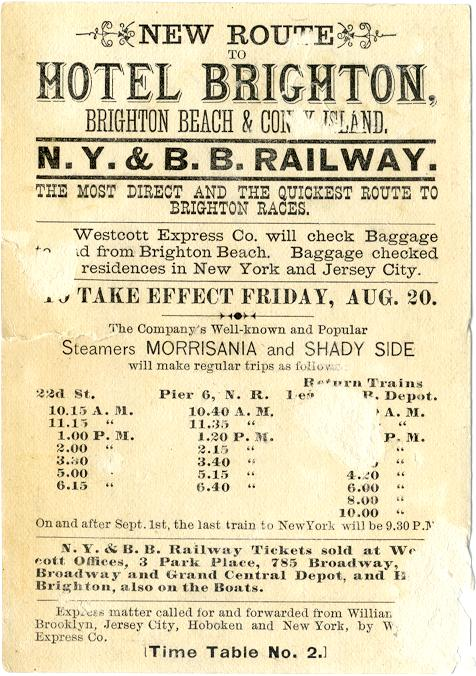
New York & Brighton Beach Railway

The New York and Brighton Beach Railway or short N.Y.&B.B. Railway (NY&BB) was a 3-mile-long (4.8 km) standard gauge railway line in Brooklyn on Long Island, New York. It started at Locust Grove in New Utrecht and terminated at Brighton Beach on Coney Island.

== History ==
The NY&BB was opened for passenger services on August 5, 1880, and operated until September 19, 1880, when the season closed. According to the 1881 report to the NY State Railroad Commission it resumed service in 1881 but carried only 4,867 passengers, earning only $2,726 against $17,602 of expenses.

In the early morning of July 27, 1881 the Brighton Beach terminal was completely destroyed by a fire of incendiary origin with a loss of $35,000 which were only partially covered by insurance. Half of the rolling stock, seven cars at an estimated value of $16,000, were also destroyed. The track was sold in 1884 and renamed in 1886 to Sea Beach & Brighton Railway. It was subsequently used by the Boynton Bicycle Railroad for two years starting in the summer of 1890.

== Documents ==
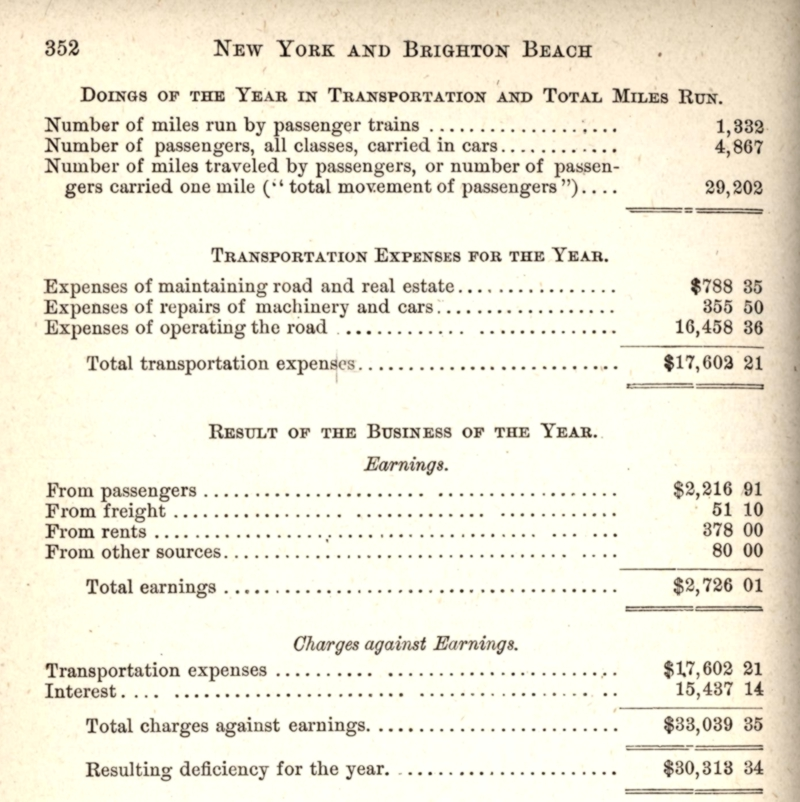
New York & Brighton Beach Railway 1881 Report

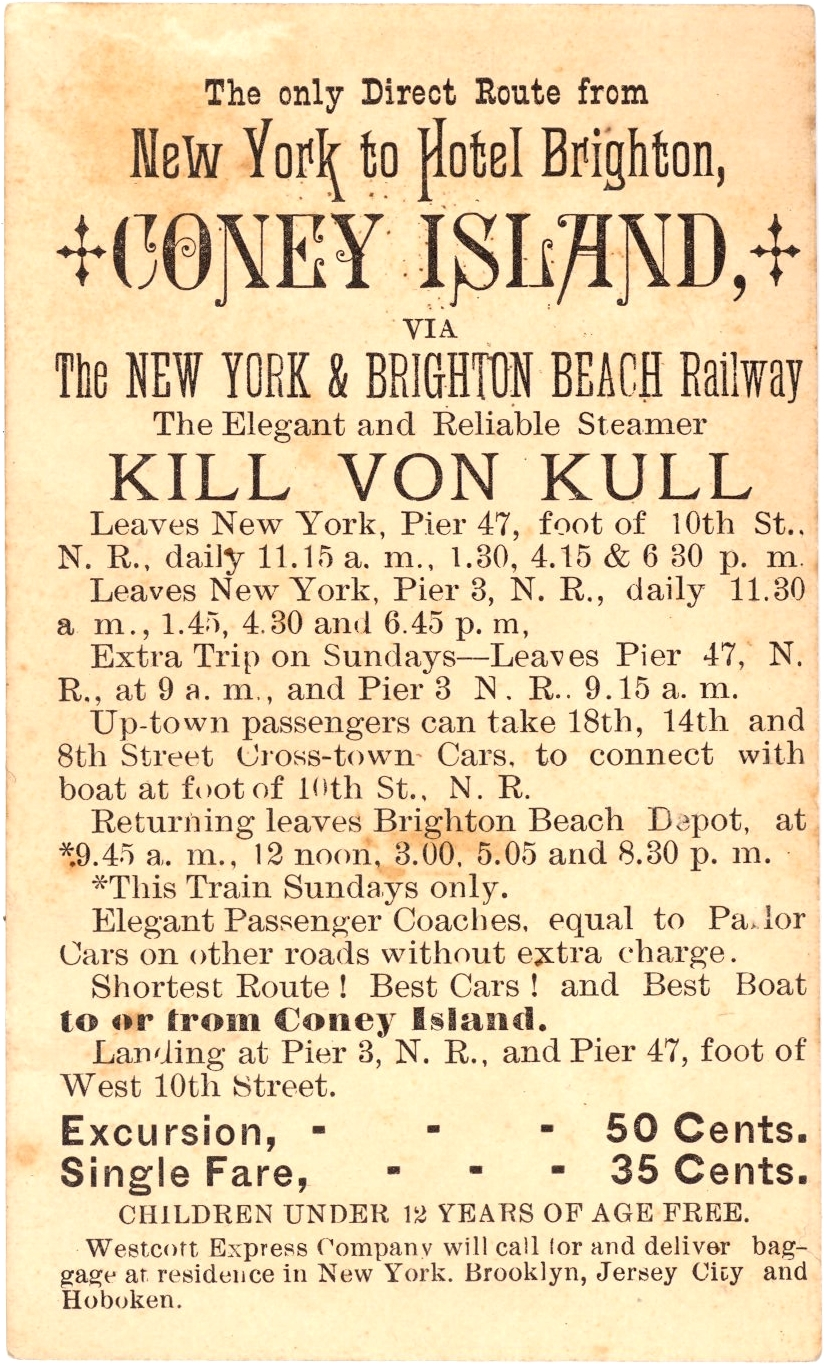
New York & Brighton Beach Railway - Kill von Kull
