= Albany and Hudson Electric Railway =

Railroad in New York State, 1899–1929

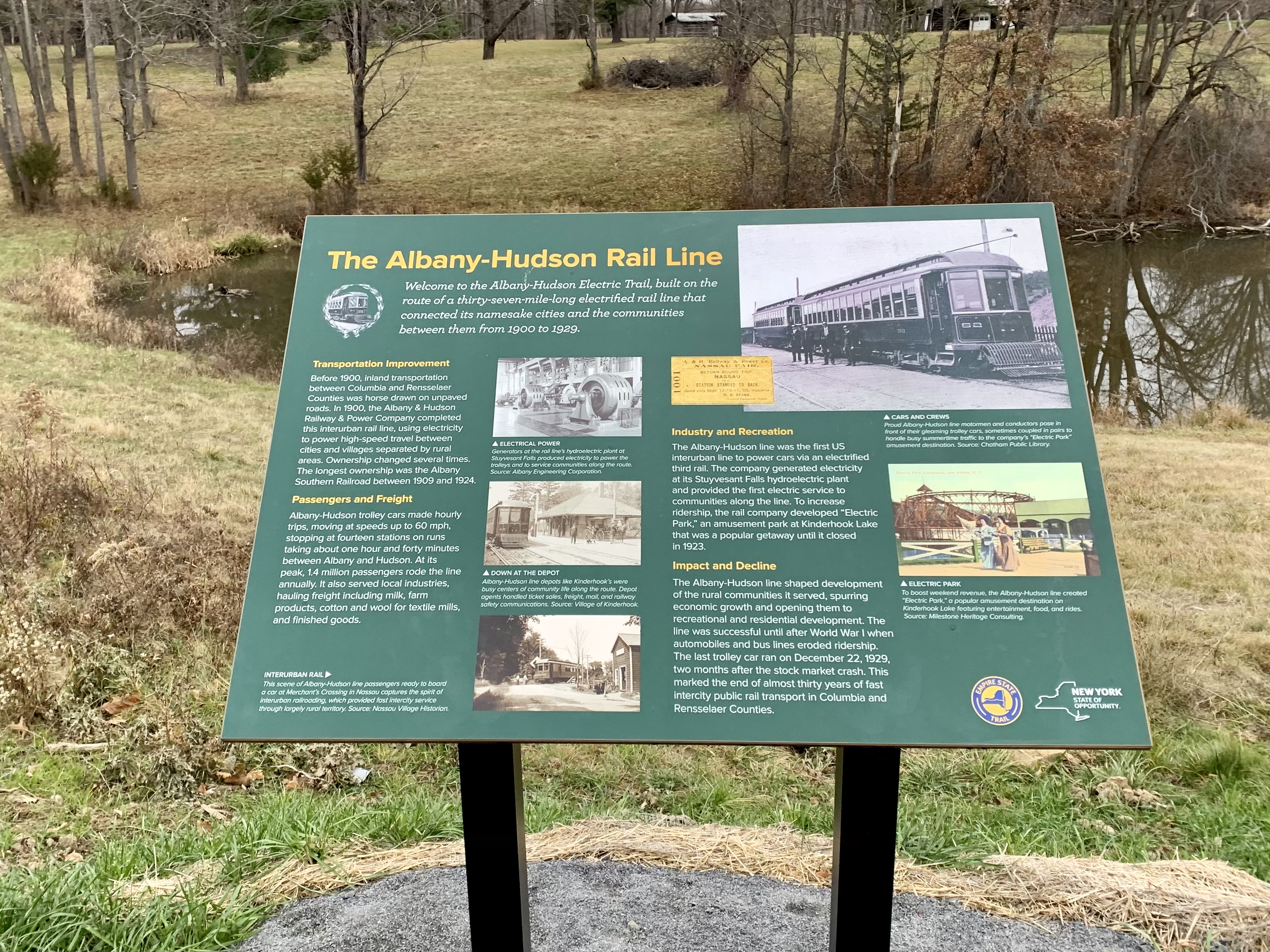
Historical marker for the Albany-Hudson Rail Line in East Greenbush

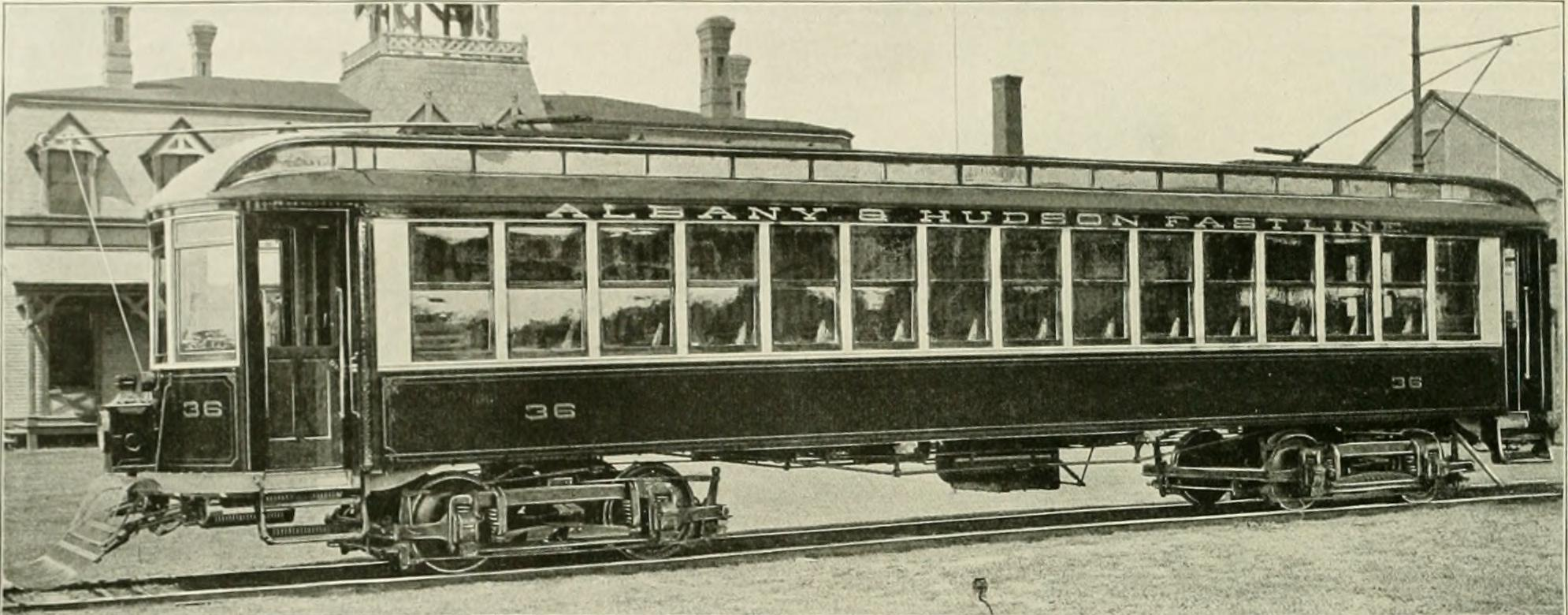
Summer car by Wason Manufacturing Co.

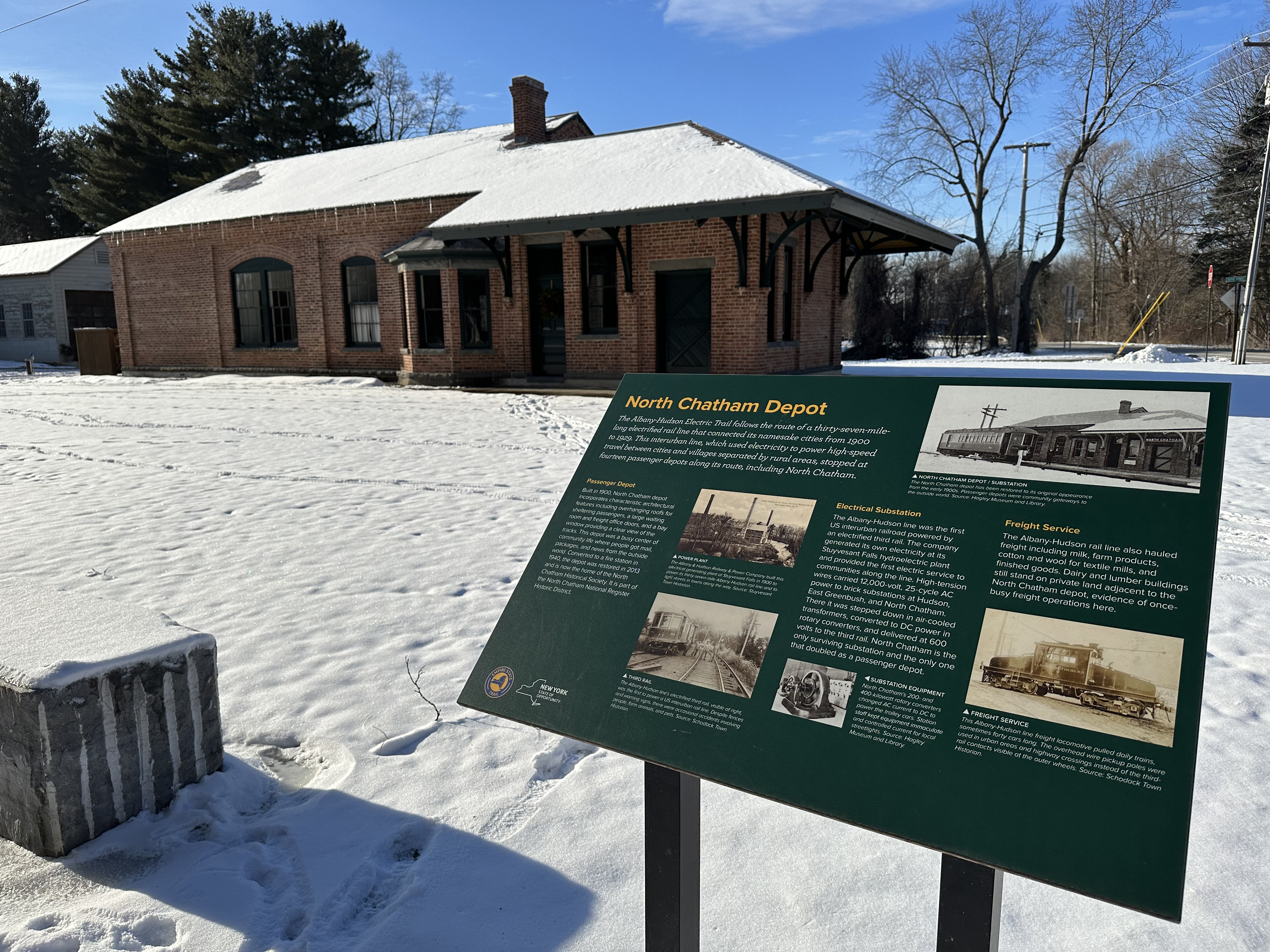
North Chatham train depot and historic marker

The Albany & Hudson Electric Railway, or the Albany & Hudson Railway & Power Company, was a 37 miles (60 km) long electric railway in New York State. It operated from 1899 to 1929 between Hudson and Albany. It had stops in 14 villages and at an amusement park on the shore of Kinderhook Lake. The company was created in 1899 by merging three railways as well as several power companies. The railway companies involved were:

- Hudson Street Railway, a street railway in Hudson
- Kinderhook & Hudson Railway, a steam railroad between Hudson and Niverville
- Greenbush & Nassau Electric Railway, an electric railway from Kinderhook and Hudson to Rensselaer and Albany

The line was completed and inaugurated in November 1900 as the first third-rail interurban line in the United States. Due to financial difficulties it was reorganized in 1902 as the Albany and Hudson Railroad (not Railway), and again in 1909 as the Albany Southern Railroad. In 1924, the line was taken over by Eastern New York Utilities Corp until being decommissioned in 1929.

Much of the route became a part of the Albany–Hudson Electric Trail, a section of the Empire State Trail, which opened at the end of 2020. Extended sections of the trail are off-road rail trail paths.
