= Saratoga and Washington Railroad =

Map

The Saratoga and Washington Railroad was an early railroad in the state of New York. It was chartered in 1834, opened for operation in 1848, and reorganized as the Saratoga and Whitehall Railroad in 1855. Its tracks eventually became part of the Delaware and Hudson Company.

The company was chartered in New York on May 2, 1834, to build a line from Saratoga Springs, New York, at the junction with the Saratoga and Schenectady Railroad, northwest to Whitehall, in Washington County.

The Panic of 1837 suspended construction on the line, which did not resume until 1847. The New York state legislature also amended the original charter, permitting the line to extend to the Vermont state line. The line opened from Saratoga Springs to Gansevoort on August 15, 1848, and all the way to Whitehall on December 10. A further extension to the Vermont state line, and a junction with the Rutland and Whitehall Railroad, opened in 1850. The Saratoga and Washington Railroad leased the latter railroad on November 1, 1850.

The company encountered financial problems and was foreclosed on in early 1855. It was sold and reorganized as the Saratoga and Whitehall Railroad in June 1855.
