= Rochester, Nunda and Pennsylvania Railroad =

Overview
- Dates of operation: 1870–1881
- Successor: Rochester, New York and Pennsylvania Railroad

Rochester, Nunda and Pennsylvania Railroad was a New York railroad. Trains ran from Sonyea south through Nunda to Swain. Parts of the railroad were sold to the Pittsburg, Shawmut and Northern Railroad. Other parts of the RN&P were graded near York, NY and Fowlerville, NY and also near Chili, New York, but no tracks were ever laid.

== Photos ==
- Paige Miller's Flickr Set, showing photos of the graded but unfinished portions of the RN&P
