= Erie and Central New York Railroad =

Railroad in the United States

Route of the E&CNY

The Erie and Central New York Railroad was first graded in 1870 and was abandoned and the bridges rotted. Reconstruction was started in 1895, opened May 1, 1898, and sold to the Delaware, Lackawanna and Western Railroad in 1903. The railroad ran from Cortland Junction to Cincinnatus, and an extension to Hancock or Deposit was planned.

A reprinted version of the Official Guide of the Railways for February 1901 contains a rare separate entry for this company when it was independent. John R. Bland of Baltimore was listed as the trustee, indicating that the railroad was bankrupt at that time. Its president and general agent, Charles O. Scull, was also from Baltimore. All the other officers were from Cortland: Lawrence N. Frederick Jr. vice president and general manager; H.M. Kellogg, secretary; W.D. Tisdale, treasurer and auditor; and I. H. Palmer, Counsel.

Further examination of the entry on page 111 of the Official Guide for February 1901 reveals that on a typical day (except Sunday) the pattern of passenger train service was that train no. 2 left Cincinnatus daily and covered the 18.8 miles to Cortland in an hour and ten minutes. Then, as train no. 1, it left from the Lehigh Valley Railroad's station at 9:50 a.m. and took 55 minutes to cover the return trip, stopping at eight intermediate stations: Cortland Junction, McGrawville, Maybury's, Solon, East Freetown, Reuben, White's Mills and Willett Station. Arriving at 10:45, it paused and then became no. 6, departing Cincinnatus at 12:15 p.m, getting back to Cortland at 1:30 p.m. At 2:45, running as no. 5, it made an eastbound trip, getting back to Cincinnatus at 4:01 p.m. After a layover of an hour, as no. 4, the train left for Cortland at 5:00 p.m. and arrived at 5:50 p.m. The final run of a typical day was as no. 3, leaving Cortland for Cincinnatus at 6:32 and arriving at 7:29 p.m. Sunday passenger service on the railroad was provided by no. 2 as indicated above, and by no. 7, returning from Cortland at 5:00 p.m. and reaching Cincinnatus an hour later. It is not known whether the stagecoaches from Cincinnatus to Pitcher and South Otselic, that connected with E. & C.N.Y. trains, ran on Sundays as well.

The railroad ran through a "fruitful agricultural region," according to the 1895 New York Times article cited below, but evidently not fruitful enough to allow the company to avoid bankruptcy.

Circa 1907 the Delaware, Lackawanna & Western Railroad renamed Willett's Station as Gee Brook. By 1911 it had reduced passenger service to double daily service, single daily on Sundays. The double-daily pattern was virtually unchanged when the D.L.& W. issued its December 1929 timetables, but by the end of 1946, passenger service had been abandoned. The freight schedule near the end was reduced to two round trips per week, with stops at McGraw, East Freetown, and Cincinnatus.

In June 1960, the Delaware, Lackawanna & Western Railroad petitioned the Interstate Commerce Commission for permission to abandon the line. The "Gee Whiz" made its final run on December 29, 1961, from Cincinnatus to Cortland with seven empty cars.

The 18 miles of track, along with 18 bridges, were removed and sold for scrap by Erie Lackawanna in 1962.

A section from Cortland Junction to Polkville was partially rebuilt for an industrial spur about 1999.
