= Elmira, Corning and Waverly Railway =

Retired public transport

The Elmira, Corning and Waverly Railway was an electric interurban line connecting the cities of Elmira, Waverly, and Corning along the Southern Tier region of New York State. The railroad was briefly controlled by the Erie Railroad. Completed in 1911, traffic dwindled through the 1920s in the face of stiff competition from better roads and increased automobile ownership. The effects of the Great Depression hastened the abandonment of all service in 1930. Replacement bus service was provided by Carpenter's Rapid Transit of Corning. The last surviving car from this line, complete with its trucks, motors and control equipment is in the permanent collection of the New York Museum of Transportation, Rush, New York.
