= Syracuse and South Bay Railway =

Overview
- Locale: Syracuse, New York through Cicero, New York to South Bay, New York
- Dates of operation: 1900–1917

Technical
- Track gauge: 4 ft 8 1/2 in (1,435 mm) standard gauge

The Syracuse and South Bay Railway, also known as the Syracuse and South Bay Electric Railroad, incorporated on May 10, 1900, was an interurban rail that ran from Syracuse, New York, through Cicero to Lower South Bay on the south shore of Oneida Lake, a distance of 12 miles (19 km).
