= Syracuse and Baldwinsville Railroad =

Overview
- Headquarters: Baldwinsville, New York
- Locale: Baldwinsville, New York to Amboy, New York, a small hamlet south of the village along NY State Route 173.
- Dates of operation: 1886–1891
- Successor: Delaware, Lackawanna and Western Railroad

Technical
- Track gauge: 4 ft 8 1/2 in (1,435 mm) standard gauge

The Syracuse and Baldwinsville Railroad was established in 1886 and opened for business in 1887. The line ran a distance of 6 miles (9.7 km) from Baldwinsville to Amboy.

In 1886, Delaware, Lackawanna and Western Railroad (DL&WRR) bought the road and it was renamed to Syracuse and Baldwinsville Railway in 1891. DL&WRR formally abandoned the line in 1897.
