= Syracuse Northern Railroad =

Railroad in the state of New York

Overview
- Locale: Syracuse, New York to Watertown, New York
- Dates of operation: 1868–1875
- Successor: Rome, Watertown and Ogdensburg Railroad

Technical
- Track gauge: 4 ft 8 1/2 in (1,435 mm) standard gauge

The Syracuse Northern Railroad, incorporated in 1868 and opened on November 9, 1871, drew trade from Liverpool to Syracuse, New York. The line had routes to Watertown, New York, and in 1875, the road was extended to Pulaski and Lacona.

The company merged in 1875 into Syracuse and Northern Railroad and once again that same year to Rome, Watertown and Ogdensburg Railroad.
