= Tonawanda Island Railroad =

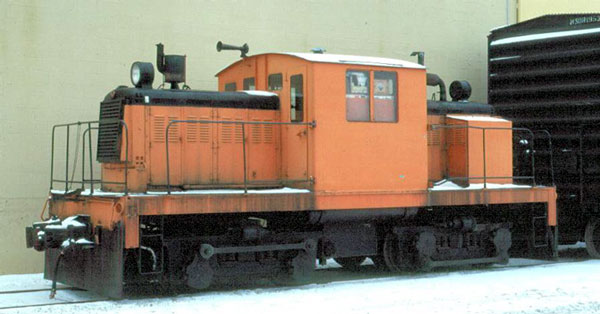
TIRL 50 tonner

The Tonawanda Island Railroad (reporting mark TIRL) operated on a 1.5-mile branch of railroad extending from the Conrail Niagara Branch in North Tonawanda, New York to Tonawanda Island.

The railroad ceased to operate after the Federal Railroad Administration (FRA) imposed an emergency order to prevent operation over a swing bridge that was found to be structurally deficient. The wood and metal bridge, known as bridge 7708810, crosses the Little River, a navigable waterway formed by the Niagara River, Ellicott Creek and Tonawanda Creek. Numerous FRA inspections also found the railroad's only piece of rolling stock, a 50-ton switcher locomotive, to be deficient.
