= South Bay, New York =

Hamlet in New York, United States

Coordinates: 43.1567°N 75.7482°W

South Bay is a small hamlet in the Town of Lenox, Lenox, a minor civil division (MCD) of Madison County in the U.S. state of New York. It occupies the southeast corner of Oneida Lake.
