= Syracuse, Geneva and Corning Railway =

Overview
- Headquarters: Watkins, New York
- Locale: Corning, New York to Geneva, New York and Dresden Branch Penn Yan to Dresden
- Dates of operation: 1875–1909
- Successor: New York Central Railroad

Technical
- Track gauge: 4 ft 8 1/2 in (1,435 mm) standard gauge

The Syracuse, Geneva and Corning Railway was established in 1875 and opened their road on December 10, 1877. The company was leased to and operated by the Fall Brook Coal Company for 20 years beginning in 1881.

On October 1, 1885, the company consolidated without a change of name with the Penn Yan and New York Railroad Company, which was leased to the New York Central and Hudson River Railroad Company in 1899. In 1909, the company merged with Geneva, Corning and Southern Railroad and once again in 1914, into New York Central Railroad (NYCRR).
