= Slatington station =

Slatington

General information
- Coordinates: 40.7524°N 75.6048°W
- Line: Lehigh Valley main line

History
- Opened: 1856
- Closed: February 4, 1961

Former lines
Preceding station	Lehigh Valley Railroad	Following station
Lehighton toward Buffalo	Main Line	Laurys toward New York or Jersey City
Lizard Creek Junction toward Buffalo	Main Line	Treichler toward New York or Jersey City
Location

Slatington station was a Lehigh Valley Railroad station in Slatington, Pennsylvania, located on the Lehigh Valley main line. The station also served the Lehigh and New England Railroad; the Reading Company at one time had an adjacent station. The Central Railroad of New Jersey had an unconnected station across the Lehigh River in Walnutport, Pennsylvania.

The Lehigh Valley opened its first station in Slatington in 1856. (Note: A state historical marker gives 1862 as the date for the construction of a "freight and passenger station" in Slatington, but there were facilities in place no later than 1856.) A second, larger station building replaced it in 1863. A third and final station, made of brick, opened circa 1877.

Passenger service to Slatington ended on February 4, 1961, with the end of all passenger service on the Lehigh Valley. The station was badly damaged by a Lehigh Valley derailment on February 1, 1969, and demolished shortly thereafter.
