= Laurys station (Lehigh Valley Railroad) =

Laurys
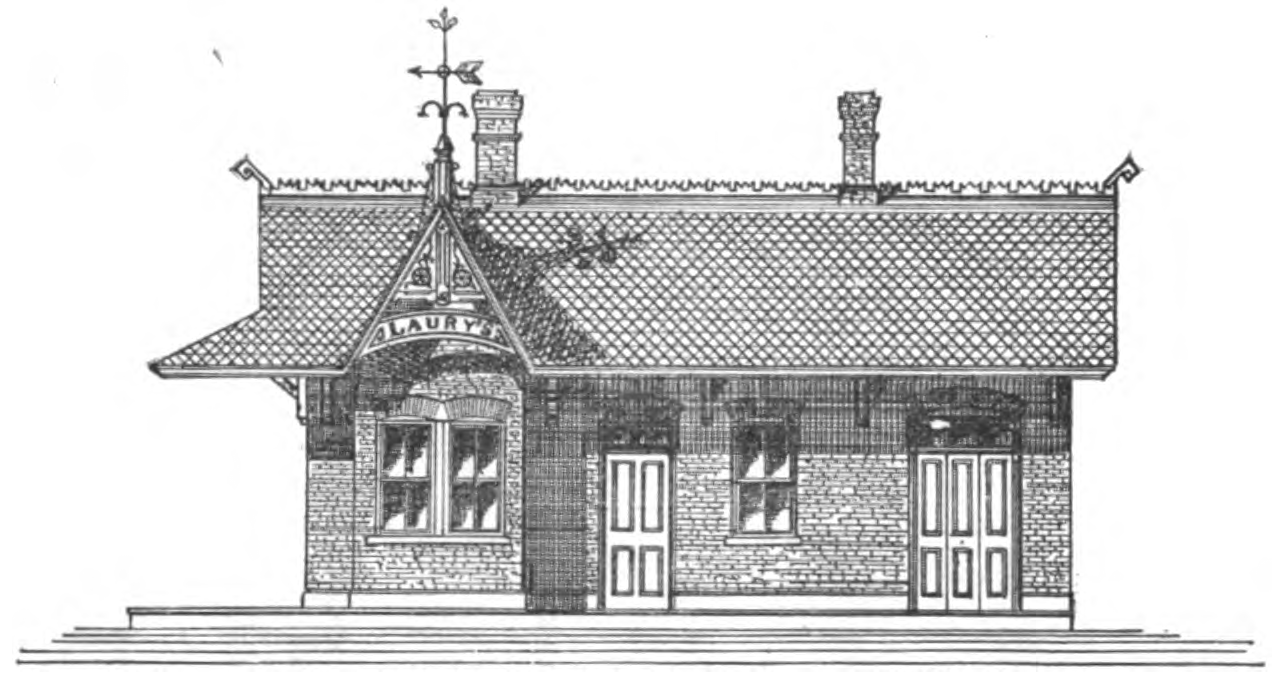
- Front elevation of Laurys station

General information
- Coordinates: 40.7234°N 75.5302°W
- Line: Lehigh Valley main line

History
- Opened: 1855
- Closed: May 1938

Former lines
Preceding station	Lehigh Valley Railroad	Following station
Slatington toward Buffalo	Main Line	Catasauqua toward New York or Jersey City
Treichler toward Buffalo	Main Line	Cementon toward New York or Jersey City
Location

Laurys station, also known as Laury's station, was a Lehigh Valley Railroad station in Laurys Station, Pennsylvania. Both the station and locality drew their name from David Laury, a local notable who established a hotel on the site in 1832 and later served as postmaster.

Service began at Laurys in 1855 with the opening of the Lehigh Valley Railroad. As was common for that era, it used a locally-constructed building. The railroad added an engine house in 1859.

The railroad constructed a new brick passenger station building in 1884. It was designed by Walter Gilman Berg. It was a single-floor structure with, appropriately for the region, a slate roof. The building measured 34 by 25 feet (10.4 m × 7.6 m). It contained separate waiting rooms for men and women, including toilets for both; an agent's office; and a baggage room.

Passenger service to Laurys ended in May 1938; the station and freight house were town down the following September.
