= Lehighton station =

Lehighton
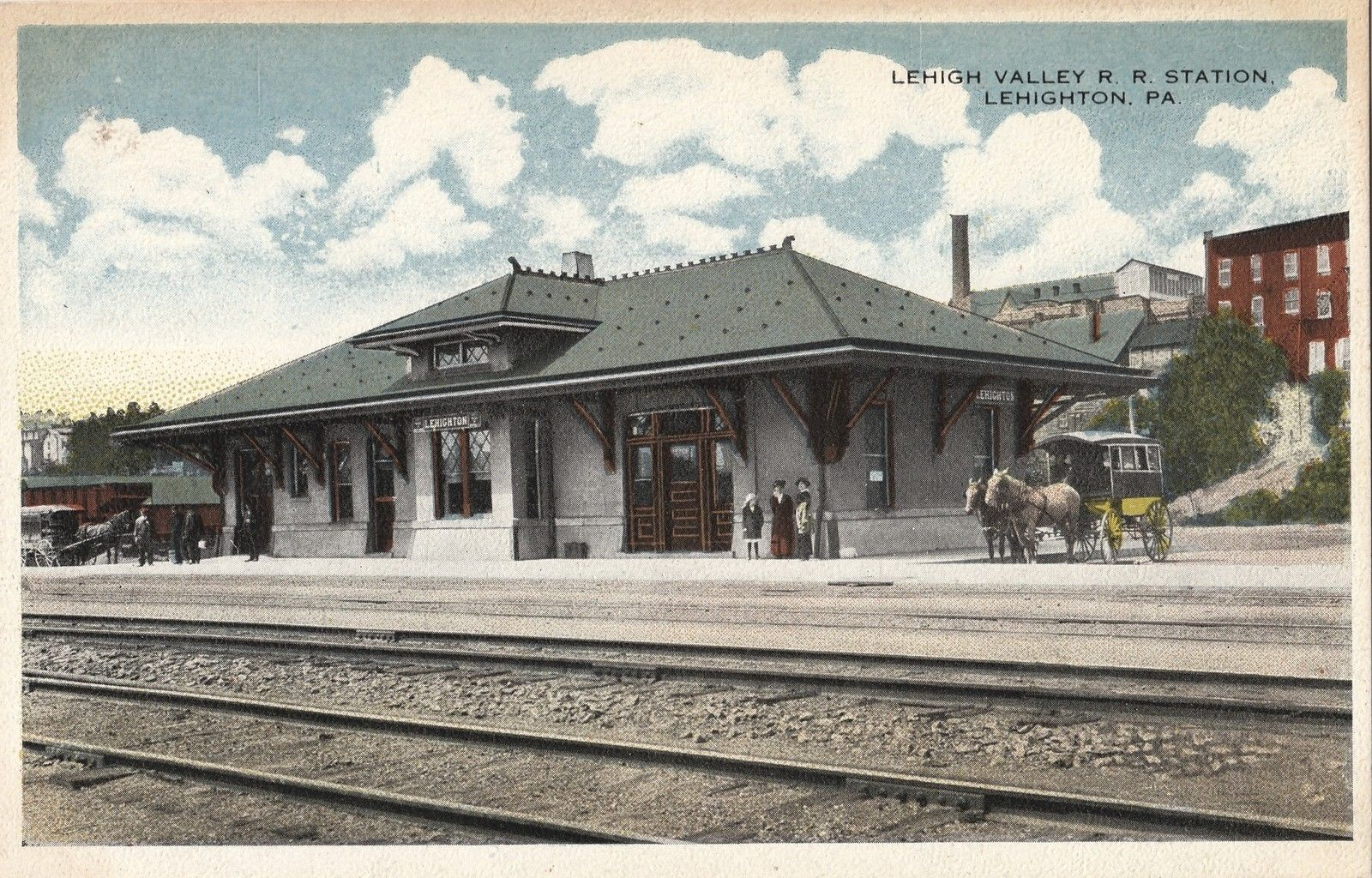
- Lehighton station in the early 1900s

General information
- Coordinates: 40.83400°N 75.70744°W
- Line: Lehigh Valley main line

History
- Opened: 1855
- Closed: February 8, 1961

Former lines
Preceding station	Lehigh Valley Railroad	Following station
Jim Thorpe toward Buffalo	Main Line	Slatington toward New York or Jersey City
Packerton toward Buffalo	Main Line	Lizard Creek Junction toward New York or Jersey City
Location

Lehighton station was a Lehigh Valley Railroad station that was located in Lehighton, Pennsylvania, USA. It was part of the Lehigh Valley main line, and was also the eastern terminus for Hazleton Branch passenger trains, although the branch diverged at Penn Haven Junction, north of Jim Thorpe.

== History and notable features ==
Lehigh Valley service to Lehighton began in 1855. The company began service between Allentown and Easton on June 11, 1855; the line was completed to Mauch Chunk (now Jim Thorpe) on September 12. As was common for that era, it used a locally constructed building.

The company completed more permanent passenger and freight houses in 1863. The Lehigh Valley's was one of two depots in Lehighton: the Lehigh and Susquehanna Railroad, later the Central Railroad of New Jersey, had its own depot some 600 yards (550 m) away. Both were located on the west bank of the Lehigh River.

The Lehigh Valley erected new buildings in Lehighton in 1913.

Passenger service to Lehighton outlasted most of the Lehigh Valley by four days. Main line service ended on February 4, 1961 with the discontinuing of the Maple Leaf and the John Wilkes, but service on the Hazleton Branch persisted until February 8.

The empty station was demolished in June 1972. Numerous pigeons, the only remaining denizens, reportedly harassed local businesses the following month in search of a new home.
