= Catasauqua station =

Former station in Catasauqua

Catasauqua
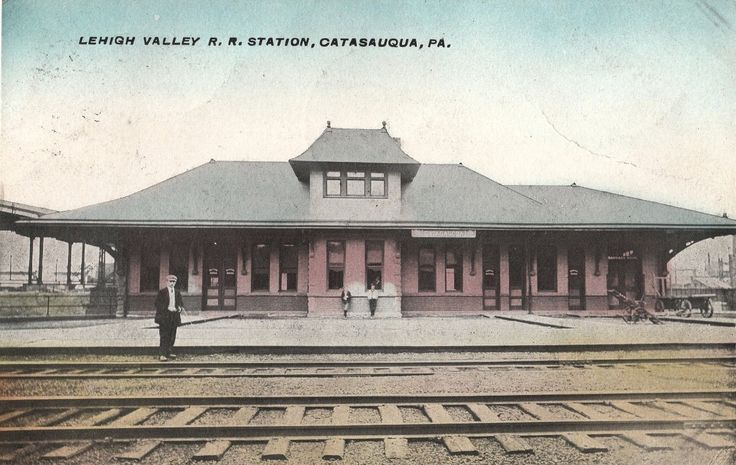
- Postcard of Catasauqua station, 1910

General information
- Coordinates: 40.6398°N 75.4660°W
- Line: Lehigh Valley main line

History
- Opened: July 4, 1855
- Closed: June 30, 1933

Former lines
Preceding station	Lehigh Valley Railroad	Following station
Laurys toward Buffalo	Main Line	Allentown toward New York or Jersey City
Hokendauqua toward Buffalo	Main Line	Fullerton toward New York or Jersey City
Location

Catasauqua station was a Lehigh Valley Railroad station in Catasauqua, Pennsylvania. It was located on the Lehigh Valley main line.

Lehigh Valley service to Catasauqua began on July 4, 1855, roughly a month after the company opened its original line between Allentown and Easton, Pennsylvania. As was common for that era, it used a locally-constructed building. The company completed more permanent passenger and freight houses in 1861. One historian characterized the buildings in Catasauqua in the late nineteenth century as "rag-tag"; a state of affairs which came to end when a runaway railway car damaged the buildings in 1904.

The new brick passenger station in Catasauqua was constructed in 1905–1906. Amenities included a waiting room, agent's room, and a baggage room. Economic hardship led to the station's closure on June 30, 1933. Some local trains continued to stop there into the late 1930s. The station building was demolished in 1941.
