= Batavia station =

Batavia station could refer to:

- the Batavia Depot Museum, a historic train station in Batavia, Illinois
- Batavia station (Lehigh Valley Railroad), a demolished train station in Batavia, New York
