= Mauch Chunk station =

Mauch Chunk station or Jim Thorpe station could refer to:

- Jim Thorpe station (Lehigh Valley Railroad)
- Mauch Chunk station (Central Railroad of New Jersey)
