= Depew station =

Depew station could refer to:

- Buffalo–Depew station, an active station in Depew, New York
- Depew station (Lehigh Valley Railroad), a defunct station in Depew, New York
