= Batavia station (Lehigh Valley Railroad) =

Batavia

General information
- Line: Lehigh Valley main line

History
- Opened: August 31, 1892
- Closed: May 12, 1959

Former lines
Preceding station	Lehigh Valley Railroad	Following station
Depew toward Buffalo	Main Line	Rochester Junction toward New York or Jersey City
Longwood toward Buffalo	Main Line	Stafford toward New York or Jersey City
Location

Batavia station was a Lehigh Valley Railroad station in Batavia, New York, located on the Lehigh Valley main line.

The Lehigh Valley reached Batavia on August 31, 1892. For the next several years Batavia was an important interchange point with the New York Central Railroad, with the Lehigh Valley Railroad exchanging cars bound for Canada. The completion of the Depew and Tonawanda Railroad in 1896 eliminated this practice. Batavia was one of many stations which lost its passenger service on May 12, 1959, when the Lehigh Valley eliminated 60% of its remaining passenger trains, including all but one round-trip west of Lehighton, Pennsylvania. Conrail, which took over the Lehigh Valley's operations in 1976, continued to use the old station as a warehouse until it was destroyed by arson in 1979.
