= Jim Thorpe station (Lehigh Valley Railroad) =

Former railroad station in Jim Thorpe, Pennsylvania, U.S.

Jim Thorpe
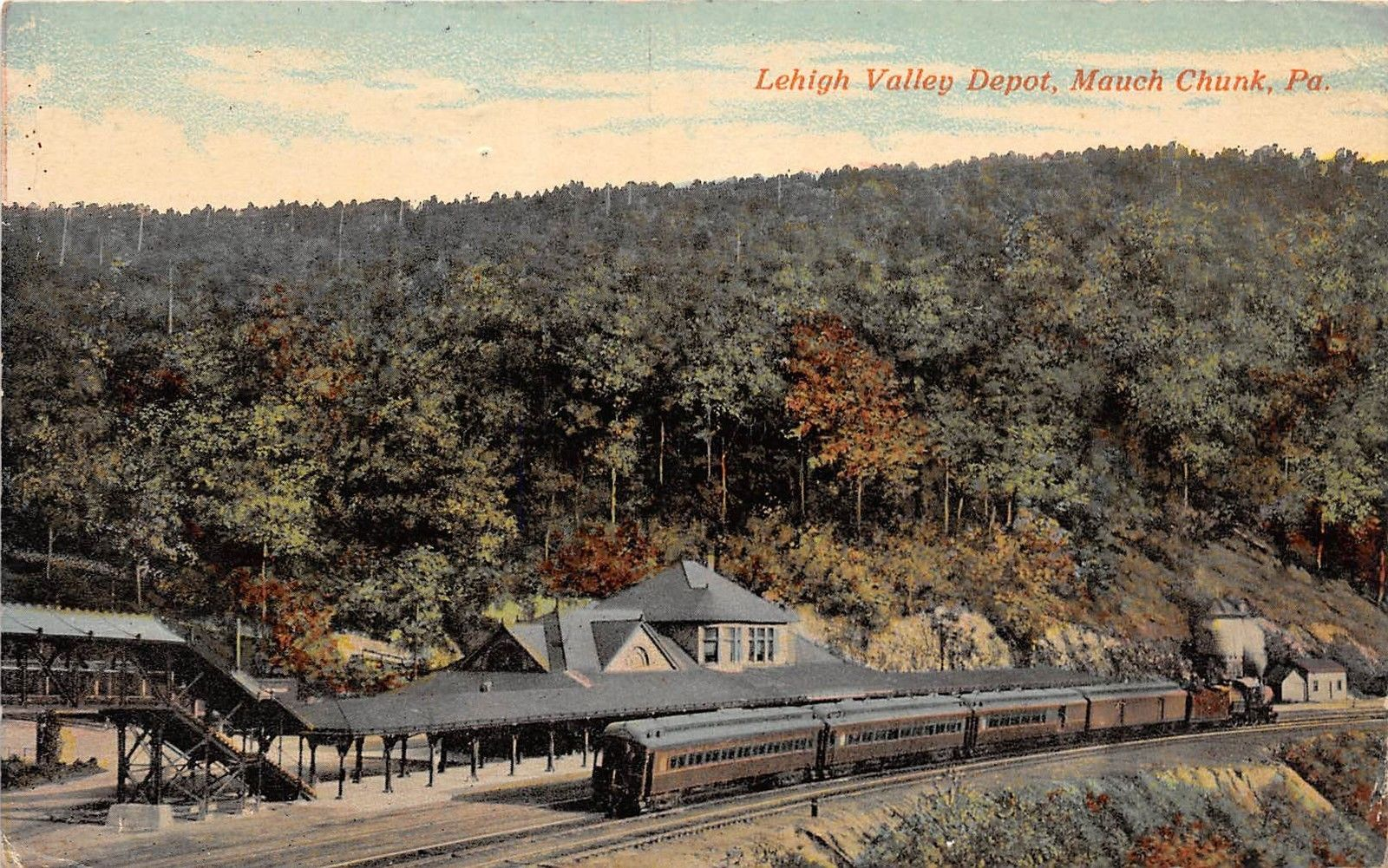
- 1913 postcard of the station

General information
- Coordinates: 40.8664°N 75.7338°W
- Line: Lehigh Valley main line

History
- Opened: September 1903
- Closed: February 8, 1961

Former lines
| Preceding station | Lehigh Valley Railroad | Following station |
|---|---|---|
| Rochester Junction toward Buffalo | Main Line | Lehighton toward New York or Jersey City |
| Glen Onoko toward Buffalo | Main Line | Packerton toward New York or Jersey City |
Location

The Jim Thorpe station, also known as the Mauch Chunk station or East Mauch Chunk station, was a Lehigh Valley Railroad station that was located in Jim Thorpe, Pennsylvania.

== History and architectural features ==
This station building was situated on the east side of the Lehigh River, in what was known as East Mauch Chunk prior to its merger with Mauch Chunk in 1955. The merged borough was named Jim Thorpe in honor of the athlete and Olympic gold medalist. The station was one of two serving the community; the Central Railroad of New Jersey had a station on the opposite side of the river.

The Lehigh Valley began serving Mauch Chunk on September 12, 1855. For the several years the Lehigh Valley used what chief engineer Robert H. Sayre described as a "temporary passenger depot." The building was expanded in 1860. This station was located at a bend in the Lehigh River, on the east bank. A bridge connected the station to Mauch Chunk on the other side of the river. A significant flood in March 1902 destroyed that bridge, leading the Lehigh Valley to abandon the station in favor of East Mauch Chunk, .5 miles (0.80 km) to the north. A significant factor in the Lehigh Valley's decision was the location of the old station on the curve, which the president of the railroad criticized as dangerous and unfavorable.

Although East Mauch Chunk existed as a named stop prior to 1902, the facilities there were primitive, described as a "rough shed." A new two-story station building, made of brick, opened in September 1903. The Lehigh Valley referred to the reopened station as Mauch Chunk and dropped references to East Mauch Chunk. Passenger service to Jim Thorpe, as it was now known, outlasted most of the Lehigh Valley by four days. Main line service ended on February 4, 1961, but service on the Hazleton Branch persisted until February 8. The now-vacant building was sold to a developer in 1963 and demolished in 1964.
