= Laurys Station, Pennsylvania =

Unincorporated community in Pennsylvania, US

- Census-designated place
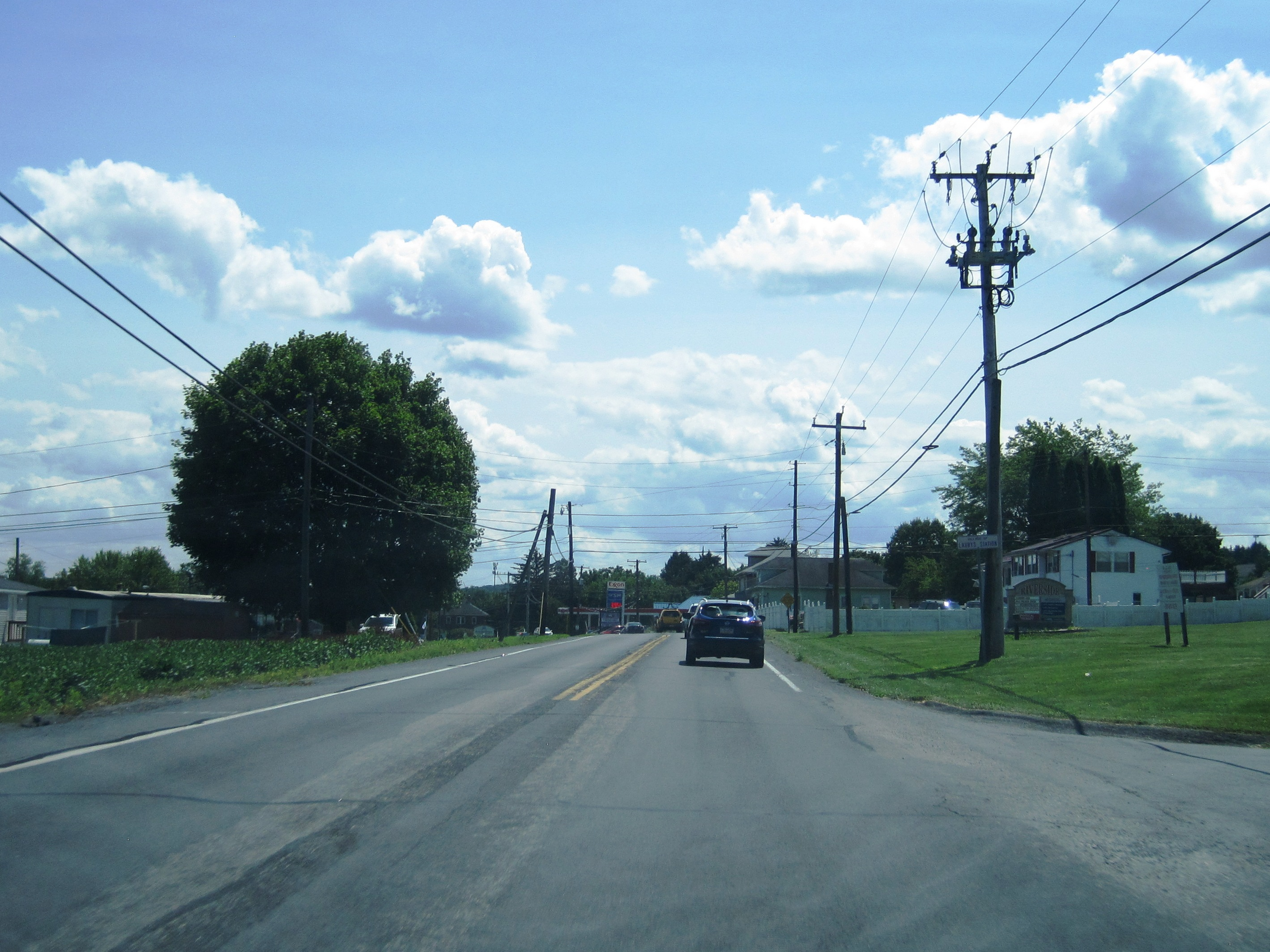
- Flag
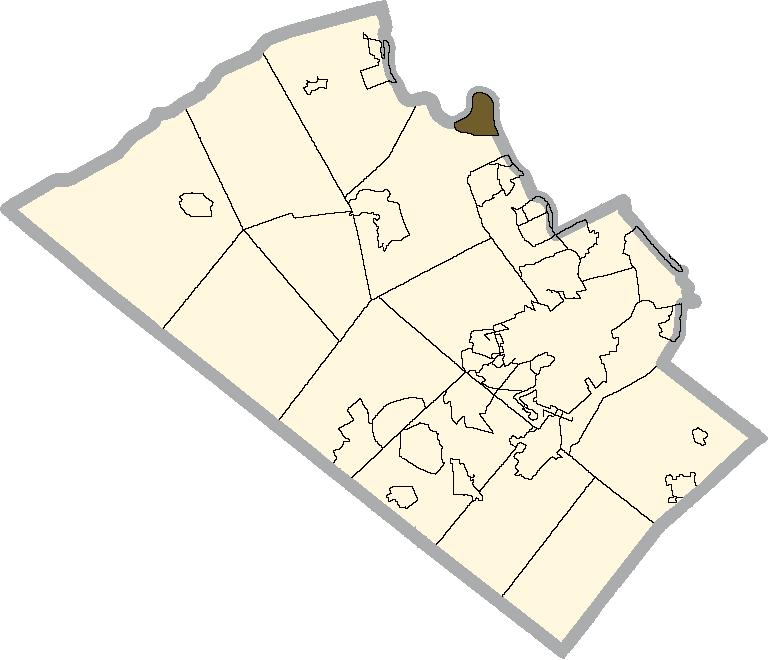
- Location of Laurys Station in Lehigh County, Pennsylvania

- Location of Laurys Station in Pennsylvania Location in the United States
- Coordinates: 40°43′23″N 75°31′49″W
- Country: United States
- State: Pennsylvania
- County: Lehigh
- Township: North Whitehall

Area
  - Census-designated place: 1.75 sq mi (4.54 km^{2})
  - Land: 1.64 sq mi (4.24 km^{2})
  - Water: 0.12 sq mi (0.31 km^{2})
- Elevation: 377 ft (115 m)

Population (2020)
  - Census-designated place: 1,170
  - Density: 715.3/sq mi (276.19/km^{2})
  - Metro: 865,310 (US: 68th)
- Time zone: UTC-5 (EST)
  - Summer (DST): UTC-4 (EDT)
- ZIP Code: 18059
- Area codes: 610 and 484
- FIPS code: 42-41880
- GNIS feature ID: 1179038

Laurys Station (previously Slate Dam) is an unincorporated community and census-designated place (CDP) in North Whitehall Township, Pennsylvania. It is part of the Lehigh Valley, which had a population of 861,899 and was the 68th-most populous metropolitan area in the U.S. as of the 2020 census. It is located approximately 9 miles (14 km) north of Allentown and about 6 miles (10 km) southeast of Walnutport.

Laurys Station is located along Pennsylvania Route 145 along the Lehigh River. As of the 2020 census, Laurys Station's population was 1,170.

== History ==
David Laury for whom Laurys Station is named

Laurys Station was initially known as "Slate Dam" after the Lehigh Coal and Navigation Company built a large dam there in 1830. In 1832, David Laury established a hotel there, which became a popular resort during the summer months. Laury became the settlement's postmaster in 1853 and station agent when the Lehigh Valley Railroad opened a station there in 1855. The Lehigh Valley Railroad's four-track mainline was located directly in the middle of the town, which was situated around present-day Mauser Street. It is unknown at what point in time the apostrophe was dropped from the village name, but Laury's Station eventually became Laurys Station.

Laurys Station, at one point in time, had its own amusement park on an island in the river. Founded by the Lehigh Valley Railroad Company in 1891 and known as Laury's Island, it included attractions such as steamboat rides, a merry-go-round, and a large dancing pavilion. It was frequently used by social and church groups in the area for gatherings and local family reunions. The Allentown Band held regular concerts there. A massive flood in February 1902 caused severe damage to the park; although repairs were made and operations continued for a few more years, the park was closed and dismantled in 1906.

== Geography ==
Laurys Station is located in northeastern Lehigh County in the northeastern part of North Whitehall Township. It sits within a bend of the Lehigh River, which borders the community to the west, north, and east. Across the river are Lehigh Township to the north and west, and Allen Township to the east.

According to the U.S. Census Bureau, Laurys Station has a total area of 1.7 square miles (4.5 km^{2}), of which 1.6 square miles (4.2 km^{2}) are land and 0.1 square miles (0.3 km^{2}), or 6.77%, are water. Via the Lehigh River, the community is part of the Delaware River watershed.

Historical population
| Census | Pop. | Note | %± |
|---|---|---|---|
| 2000 | 1,343 | | — |
| 2010 | 1,243 | | −7.4% |
| 2020 | 1,170 | | −5.9% |

== Education ==
Laurys Station is part of the Parkland School District. Students in grades nine through 12 attend Parkland High School.
