= Depew station (Lehigh Valley Railroad) =

Depew
- 1898 map of Depew, New York, showing the parallel lines of the Lehigh Valley Railroad and New York Central Railroad

General information
- Coordinates: 42.910111°N 78.697170°W
- Line(s): Lehigh Valley main line; Niagara Falls Branch

History
- Closed: February 4, 1961

Former lines
Preceding station	Lehigh Valley Railroad	Following station
Buffalo Terminus	Main Line	Batavia toward New York or Jersey City
Niagara Junction toward Buffalo	Main Line	Longwood toward New York or Jersey City
North Tonawanda toward Suspension Bridge	Niagara Falls Branch	Terminus

Depew station was a Lehigh Valley Railroad station in Depew, New York, a suburb of Buffalo. It was the first station east of Niagara Junction, where Lehigh Valley trains left the Buffalo–Jersey City, New Jersey main line for Tonawanda, New York, and thence to Niagara Falls. Passengers heading for Toronto, Ontario would transfer at Depew. The station also handled Canada-bound freight; replacing an interchange operation with the New York Central Railroad at Batavia.

Depew was one of several stations in a tight corridor leading the Buffalo: it lay approximately 1/4 mile (0.40 km) from the New York Central's station and 1 mile (1.6 km) from the Erie Railroad's station. The station was located on the west side of Transit Road (New York State Route 78), adjacent to the New York Central main line.

Service to Depew ended on February 4, 1961, with the end of passenger service on the Lehigh Valley, the final train being the Maple Leaf.
