= Lester C. Tichy =

American architect and industrial designer (1905–1981)

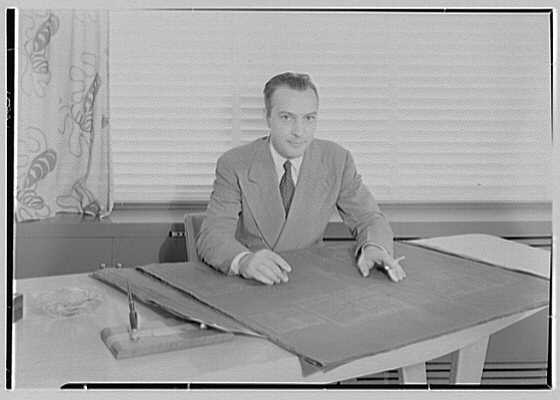
- Lester Tichy at the drafting board with cigarette in hand (1944).
- Born: 1905
- Died: 1981 (aged 75–76)
- Education: Columbia University
- Occupations: Architect; Industrial Designer

Lester C. Tichy (1905–1981) was a prolific 20th-century American architect and industrial designer. Tichy is perhaps best known for his association with the Pennsylvania Railroad, for which he created the infamous "Clamshell", an aluminum and steel canopy over the electronic ticketing area, in Penn Station’s Main Waiting Room in New York City. Tichy's "Clamshell" is largely seen as a harbinger of the station's ultimate demolition, and stands for the lost landmark's final decline.

== Early life ==
Born in 1905, Tichy studied at Columbia University in Upper Manhattan. After graduation, Tichy toured Europe and began working under John Russell Pope, architect of the Jefferson Memorial.

Though Pope's firm was working on a number of notable Washington, D.C. structures at the time, Tichy ultimately opted to strike out on his own. Free of Pope's Beaux-Arts shackles, Tichy hung up his shingle as a distinctively modern architect.

== Career ==
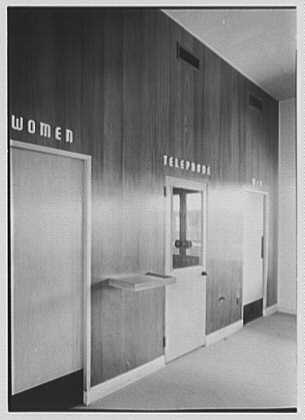
Interior detail of Tichy's sleek station at Aberdeen, MD

Dubbed a "[n]oted [a]rchitect" by 1956, Tichy ultimately left his mark on homes, railroad stations, dormitories, and even the paint schemes of Long Island Rail Road trains over the course of a long and varied career.

Tichy was a protégé of Raymond Loewy, another venerable Pennsylvania Railroad designer. Like Loewy, Tichy proceeded to design a wide range of structures for the Pennsylvania across its sprawling system.

At Aberdeen, Tichy designed a compact, streamlined station with Machine Age details. At Enola, Tichy created a dormitory that provided "neat," "quiet," and "comfortable" accommodations for Railroad men in need of a place to retire after long freight runs. Another Tichy dorm at Harrisburg offered "big, full-height, corrugated-glass" windows in keeping with the "progressive" tastes of the times. And between 1949 and 1955, Tichy designed modern paint schemes for the Long Island Rail Road, a Pennsylvania subsidiary.

Tichy's modernist sensibilities were not confined to the "standard railroad of the world." Throughout the middle of the 20th-century, Tichy designed flat-roofed structures that found critical acclaim in the publications of his time. In 1945, House & Garden recognized one of Tichy's telltale houses with a prize in its "Blueprints for Tomorrow" architectural contest. This newfound notoriety led to additional commissions, including a "streamlined metal and glass snack bar" for La Guardia Airport in 1948.

With Tichy's status cemented, acclaim flowed. In 1956, a LIFE Magazine advertiser heralded Tichy's designs in a full-page spread. "Tichy has brought summer fun and freedom indoors," the advertiser swooned.

== Penn Station and Tichy's "Clamshell" ==
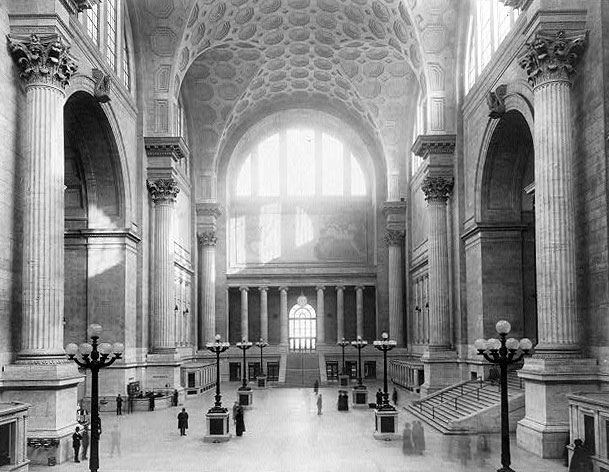
New York Penn Station's Main Waiting Room as it originally appeared in 1911. The Pennsylvania Railroad would eventually install Tichy's "Clamshell" under the archway at left.

Though Tichy's imprint appeared on a range of modern structures, he became best identified with his 1956 "Clamshell" in Manhattan’s original Penn Station.

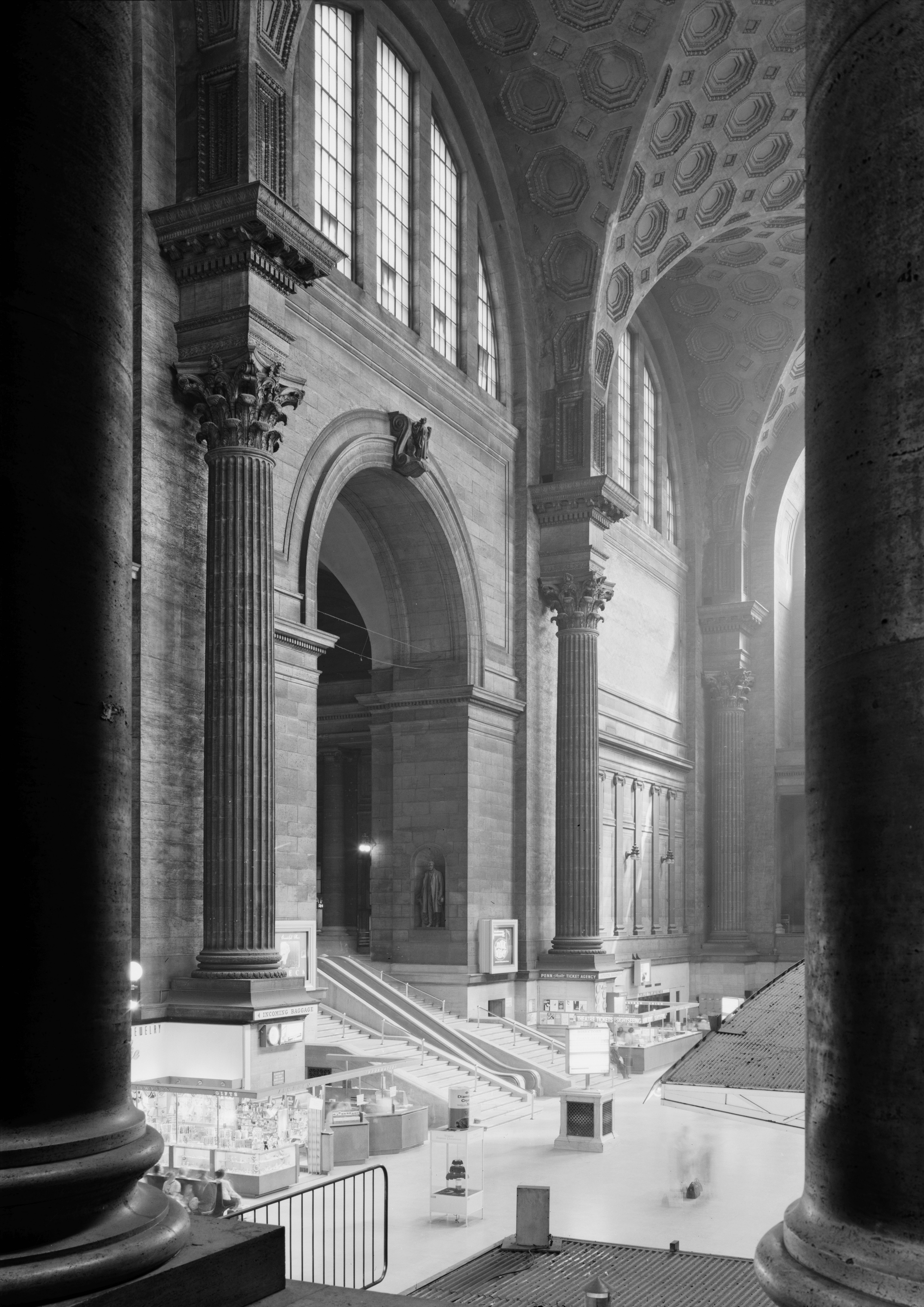
The Main Waiting Room with Tichy's concessions installed. A portion of the "Clamshell's" roof appears just to the right of the bottom of the escalators.

By 1952, Tichy remained associated with the Pennsylvania Railroad, although he had left its employ. The Pennsylvania, confronting mounting passenger losses, contracted with Tichy to replace Penn Station's grand Savarin dining room with a series of two bowling alleys in an attempt to raise cash off its cavernous – but cash-bleeding – Manhattan facility. Throughout 1952, Tichy partnered with the Pennsylvania to develop revenue-generating concessions at Penn Station and air-rights sales over its adjacent rail yards.

Tichy's new partnership with the Pennsylvania was a harbinger of things to come. In 1954, Tichy himself "prepared plans for an orderly demolition" of the beloved station, and began associating with real estate titans William Zeckendorf and Benjamin Swig.

With the scent of redevelopment in the air, Tichy then began designing an airline-style ticket counter to satiate the Pennsylvania's desire to boost ticket sales and make money off its station. "Whether desperately or cynically," wrote The New York Times, railroad executives "seemed to understand that redevelopment of their money-losing, nine-acre station would be more palatable if the public could be made to forget the glories of Mr. McKim's original design."

The result was a "modernistic, clamshell-shaped, sawtooth-edged, fluorescent-bathed ticket counter" in the center of Penn Station's monumental – but, by then, soot-streaked and grimy – Main Waiting Room. Erected at a cost of $2 million, Tichy's "Clamshell" housed a new-fangled electronic ticket center that was "supposed to convince passengers that railroading was as modern as flying." "The glowing fluorescent curve under the soiled classical space was like a jet plane next to a grimy locomotive," wrote architectural historian Christopher Gray.

Today, some remember Tichy's "Clamshell" as a "luminous," "soaring," and "swooping" example of mid-century modern design. But to others, such as historian and sociologist Lewis Mumford, the "Clamshell" was a "great treason" to Penn Station's design. Mumford speculated the Pennsylvania Railroad plopped Tichy's clamshell in the center of Penn Station's "otherwise uninterrupted grand axi[s]" to provide "justification" for "destroying the station from the inside."

The Railroad did ultimately demolish Penn Station in an "[e]pic [a]ct of [c]ivic [v]andalism," and many now agree Tichy's "Clamshell" was "a nail in the station's coffin" and "the final insult to McKim, Mead & White’s heroic 1910 station." Tichy "brutally raped" the station, concluded architect B. Sumner Gruzen.

== Legacy ==
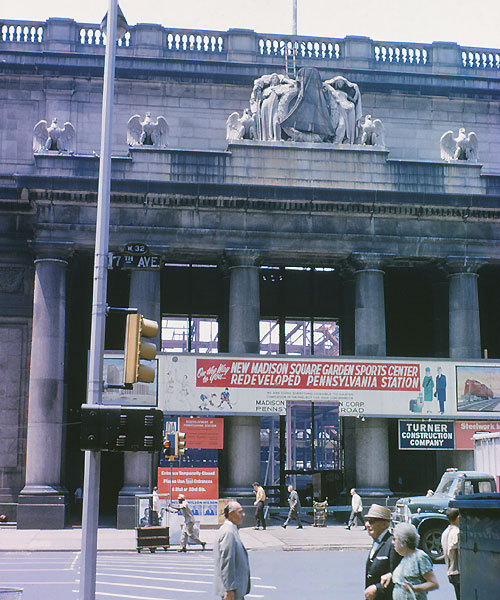
The Pennsylvania Railroad demolished its flagship station using a phased approach originally conceptualized by Tichy.

Today, Tichy's "Clamshell" is remembered as the first shot in the Pennsylvania Railroad's battle to destroy its own flagship station. Yet the modernist played a far more integral role in Penn Station's destruction than commonly thought.

Architectural Forum described Tichy's early demolition plans as "how to turn a monument into cash," and heralded his three-stage scheme for "shrinking the glory to fatten the revenue." After a series of starts and stops, the Pennsylvania Railroad did eventually refine and deploy Tichy's demolition and redevelopment concept to destroy the original Penn Station and construct Madison Square Garden on top. Thus, every time a railroad passenger "scuttles" into today's Penn Station "like a rat," they have, in part, architect Lester C. Tichy to thank.
