= Buffalo station (Lehigh Valley Railroad) =

Buffalo
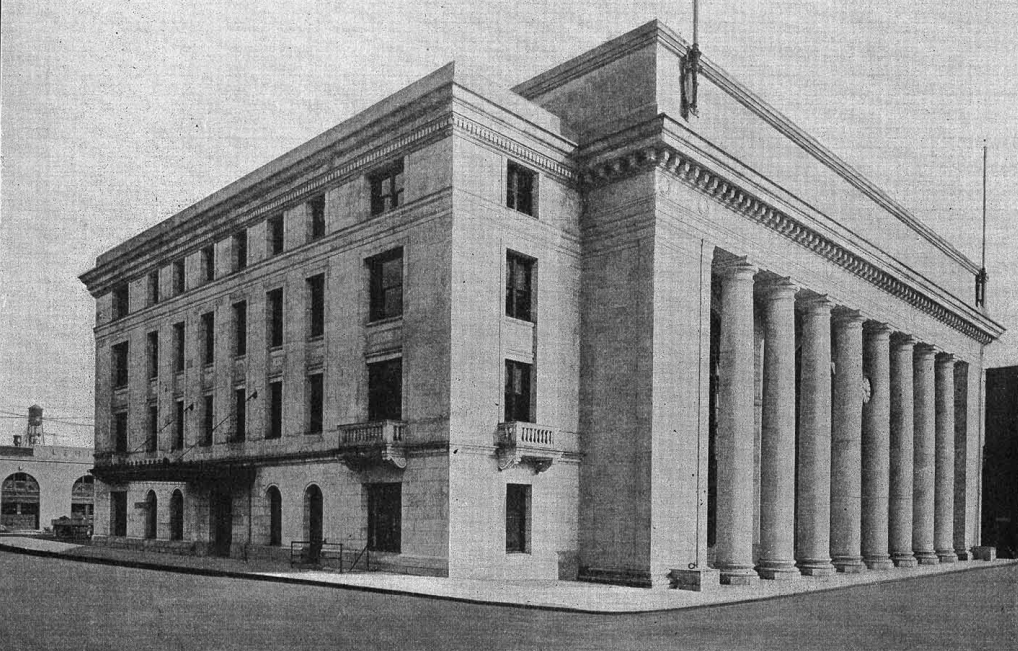
- The station building soon after opening in 1916

General information
- Location: Scott and Main Streets; Buffalo, New York, U.S.
- Coordinates: 42°52′40″N 78°52′35″W
- Line: Lehigh Valley main line

History
- Opened: August 29, 1916
- Closed: August 11, 1955

Former lines
Preceding station	Lehigh Valley Railroad	Following station
Terminus	Main Line	Depew toward New York or Jersey City
Terminus	Main Line	East Buffalo toward New York or Jersey City
Preceding station	Erie Railroad	Following station
Terminus	Buffalo Division	East Buffalo toward Hornell
Blasdell toward Jamestown	Buffalo and South Western Railroad	Terminus
Location

The Lehigh Valley Terminal was a railroad station in downtown Buffalo, New York. The Lehigh Valley Railroad opened it in 1916, replacing an older station one block east at Scott and Washington streets. Lehigh Valley trains served at the station included the Black Diamond, Maple Leaf, and Star. The station handled the Lehigh Valley's passenger traffic in Buffalo until 1955, when it was demolished to make room for the Niagara Thruway (Interstate 190). The Lehigh Valley moved its operations to a smaller station outside the downtown area at Dingens and South Ogden Streets, which served until the end of all Lehigh Valley passenger service in 1961. The terminal also hosted the Erie Railroad's passenger trains from 1935 until 1951, when that railroad ceased serving Buffalo.
