= Pennsylvania Station (1910–1963) =

Former train station in New York City

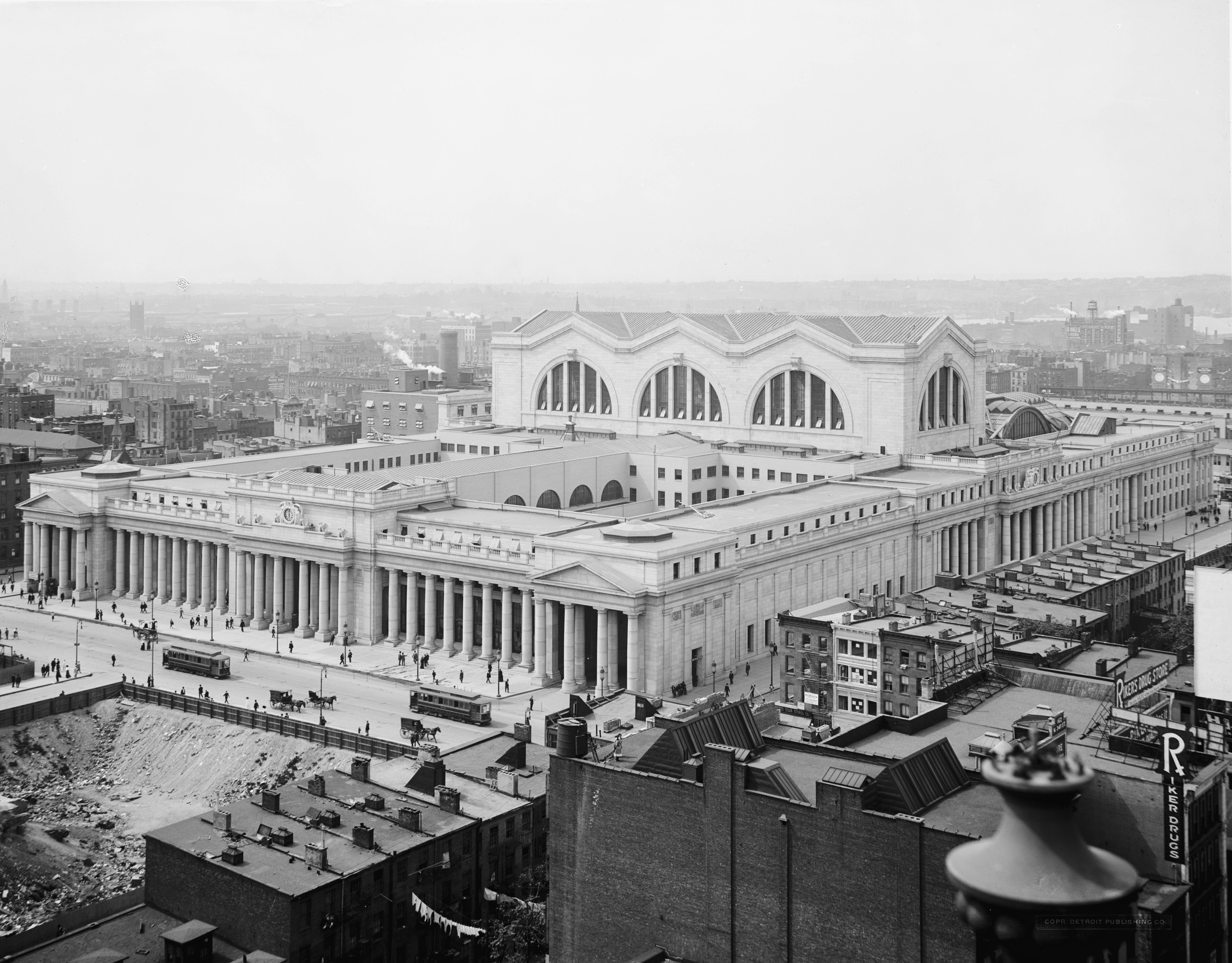
- View from the northeast in the 1910s

General information
- Location: New York City; U.S.
- Coordinates: 40.7503°N 73.9931°W
- Owner: Pennsylvania Railroad; Penn Central

Construction
- Architect: McKim, Mead, and White
- Architectural style: Beaux-Arts

Other information
- Status: Demolished (above ground)

History
- Opened: September 8, 1910 (LIRR); November 27, 1910 (PRR)

Key dates
- Construction: 1904–1910
- Demolition: 1963–1966
- Reopened: 1968 (as Penn Station)

Former services
Preceding station	Pennsylvania Railroad	Following station
Manhattan Transfer (Note: Manhattan Transfer was closed 1937; next southbound station post-1937 is Newark Penn Station) toward Chicago	Main Line	Terminus
Manhattan Transfer toward New Brunswick	New Brunswick Line	Terminus
Preceding station	Long Island Rail Road	Following station
Terminus	Main Line	Woodside toward Greenport
Preceding station	New York, New Haven and Hartford Railroad	Following station
Terminus	Main Line Express service	New Haven Terminus
Preceding station	Lehigh Valley Railroad	Following station
Manhattan Transfer toward Buffalo	Main Line	Terminus
Preceding station	Baltimore and Ohio Railroad	Following station
Manhattan Transfer toward Chicago	Main Line Until 1926	Terminus
Location

Pennsylvania Station (often abbreviated to Penn Station) was a historic railroad station in New York City that was built for, named after, and originally occupied by the Pennsylvania Railroad (PRR). The station occupied an 8-acre (3.2 ha) plot bounded by Seventh and Eighth Avenues and 31st and 33rd Streets in Midtown Manhattan. Because the station shared its name with several stations in other cities, it was sometimes called New York Pennsylvania Station. Originally completed in 1910, the aboveground portions of the building were demolished between 1963 and 1966, and the underground concourses and platforms were heavily renovated to form the current Pennsylvania Station within the same footprint.

Designed by McKim, Mead, and White and completed in 1910, the station enabled direct rail access to New York City from the south for the first time. Its above ground head house and train shed were considered a masterpiece of the Beaux-Arts style and one of the great architectural works of New York City. Underground, the station contained 11 platforms serving 21 tracks, in approximately the same layout as the current Penn Station, which has had various intervening modifications. The original building was one of the first stations to include separate waiting rooms for arriving and departing passengers, and when built, these were among the city's largest public spaces.

Passenger traffic began to decline after World War II, and in the 1950s, the Pennsylvania Railroad sold the air rights to the property and shrank the railroad station. Starting in 1963, the above-ground head house and train shed were demolished, a loss that galvanized the modern historic preservation movement in the United States. Over the next six years, the below-ground concourses and waiting areas were heavily renovated, becoming the modern Penn Station, while Madison Square Garden and Pennsylvania Plaza were built above them. The sole remaining portions of the original station are the underground platforms and tracks, as well as scattered artifacts on the mezzanine level above it.

== Design ==
Occupying two city blocks from Seventh Avenue to Eighth Avenue and from 31st to 33rd Streets, the original Pennsylvania Station building was designed by McKim, Mead & White. The overall plan was created by Charles Follen McKim. After McKim's health declined, William Symmes Richardson oversaw the completion of the design, while Teunis J. Van Der Bent oversaw the engineering. Covering an area of about 8 acres (3.2 ha), it had frontages of 788 feet (240 m) along the side streets and 432 feet (132 m) long along the main avenues. (Note: Architectural historian Leland M. Roth gives a slightly different measurement of 780 by 430 feet (240 by 130 m). A 1929 report gives a measurement of 788.75 by 430.50 feet (240.41 by 131.22 m).) The land lot occupied about 800 feet (240 m) along 31st and 33rd Streets.

Over 3 million cubic yards (2.3 million cubic metres) of dirt had been excavated during construction. The original structure was made of 490,000 cubic feet (14,000 m^{3}) of pink granite, 60,000 cubic feet (1,700 m^{3}) of interior stone, 27,000 short tons (24,107 long tons; 24,494 t) of steel, 48,000 short tons (42,857 long tons; 43,545 t) of brick, and 30,000 light bulbs. The superstructure consisted of about 650 steel columns. The building had an average height of 69 feet (21 m) above the street, though its maximum height was 153 feet (47 m). Some 25 acres (10 ha) or 28 acres (11 ha) of track surrounded Penn Station. At the time of Penn Station's completion, The New York Times called it "the largest building in the world ever built at one time".

=== Exterior ===
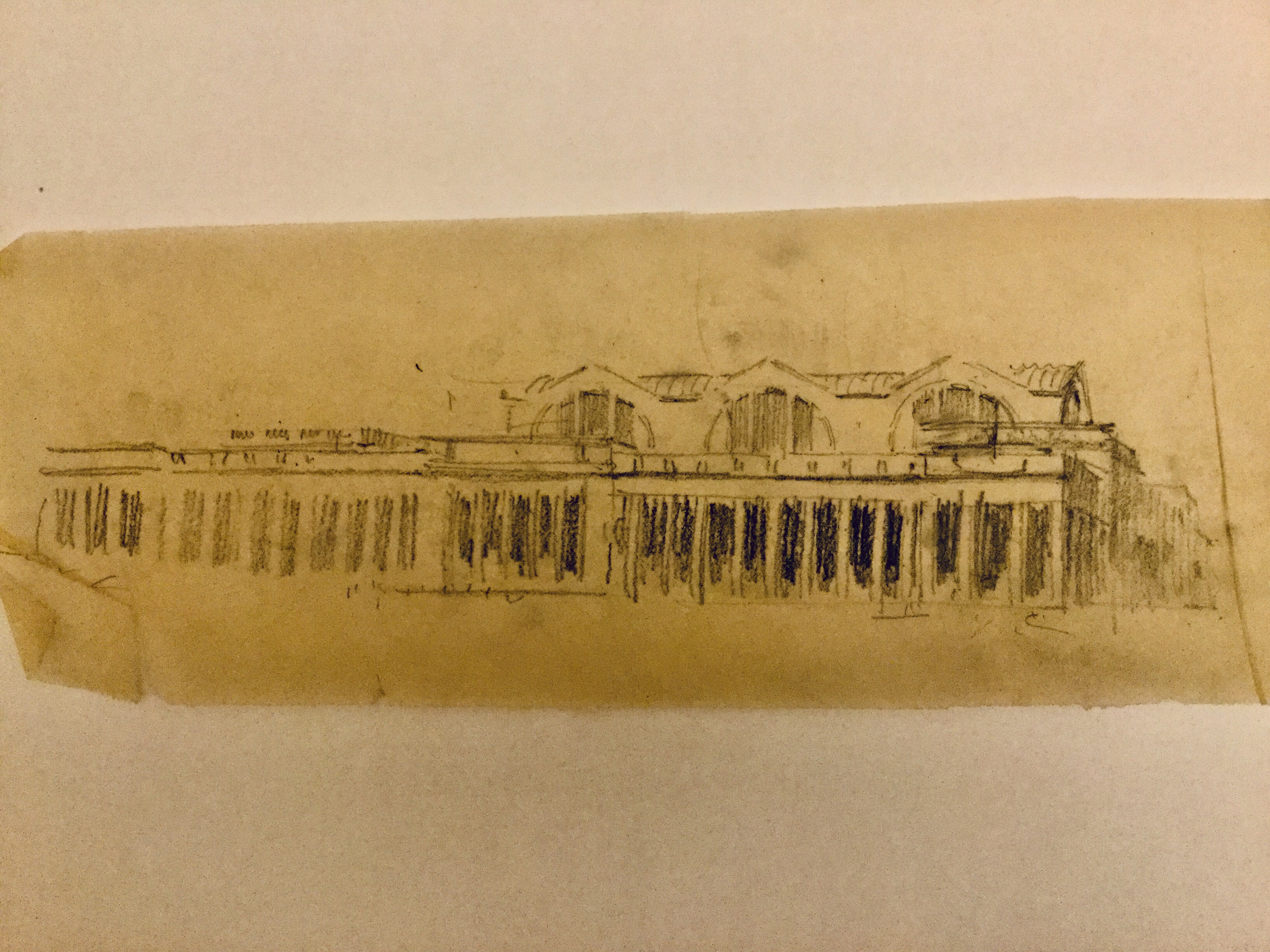
A sketch of Pennsylvania Station, Office of McKim, Mead and White

The exterior of Penn Station was marked by colonnades of Roman unfluted columns based on the Classical Greek-style Doric order. These columns, in turn, were modeled after landmarks such as the Acropolis of Athens. The rest of the facade was modeled on St. Peter's Square in Vatican City, as well as the Bank of England headquarters. The colonnades embodied the sophisticated integration of multiple functions and the circulation of people and goods. The colonnades had a strong horizontal orientation, interrupted only by the lunette windows and the roof of the waiting room. The ornamentation was intentionally simple, with emphasis being placed on the "unity and simplicity" of different parts of the design. The roof was made of Monel alloy, an Inco product.

==== Entrances and colonnades ====
The building had entrances from all four sides. The main entrance was at the intersection of Seventh Avenue and 32nd Street, at the center of the Seventh Avenue facade. It was the most elaborate of Penn Station's entrances. Above the center of the entrance, 61 feet (19 m) above the sidewalk, was a clock with 7-foot-diameter (2.1 m) faces. Two plaques were placed above the arcade entrance. One plaque contained inscriptions of the names of individuals who had led the New York Tunnel Extension project, while the other included carvings of franchise dates and the names of contractors.

Twin 63-foot-wide (19 m) carriageways at the northeast and southeast corners, modeled after Berlin's Brandenburg Gate, led to the two railroads served by the station. One carriageway ran along the north side of the building, serving LIRR trains, while the other the south side served PRR trains. The walls of each carriageway were flanked by pilasters for a distance of 279 feet (85 m). Ramps spanned the carriageways and led into the waiting room and concourse. The carriageways descended to the exit concourse at the middle of the station. From there, vehicles could travel to the baggage drop on the eastern end or return to Seventh Avenue. A separate passageway along the south side of the station carried baggage to the Eighth Avenue end of the station.

An open colonnade was used along the north, east, and south facades. The entirety of the east facade had a Doric-style colonnade. The easternmost portions of the north and south facades, adjacent to the carriageways, also contained 230-foot-wide (70 m) colonnades. Each column measured 35 feet (11 m) high by 4.5 feet (1.4 m) across. The remainder of the facade contained pilasters rather than columns. An approximately 45-foot-wide (14 m) section of the Eighth Avenue facade was divided into three large openings, which comprised a large rear entrance to the main concourse.

The station contained four pairs of sculptures designed by Adolph Weinman, each of which consists of two female personifications, Day and Night. These sculptural pairs, whose figures were based on model Audrey Munson, flanked large clocks on the top of each side of the building. Day was depicted with a garland of sunflowers in her hand, looking down at passengers, while Night was depicted with a serious expression and a cloak over her head. The Day and Night sculptures were each accompanied by two small stone eagles. There were also 14 larger, freestanding stone eagles placed on Penn Station's exterior.

=== Interior ===
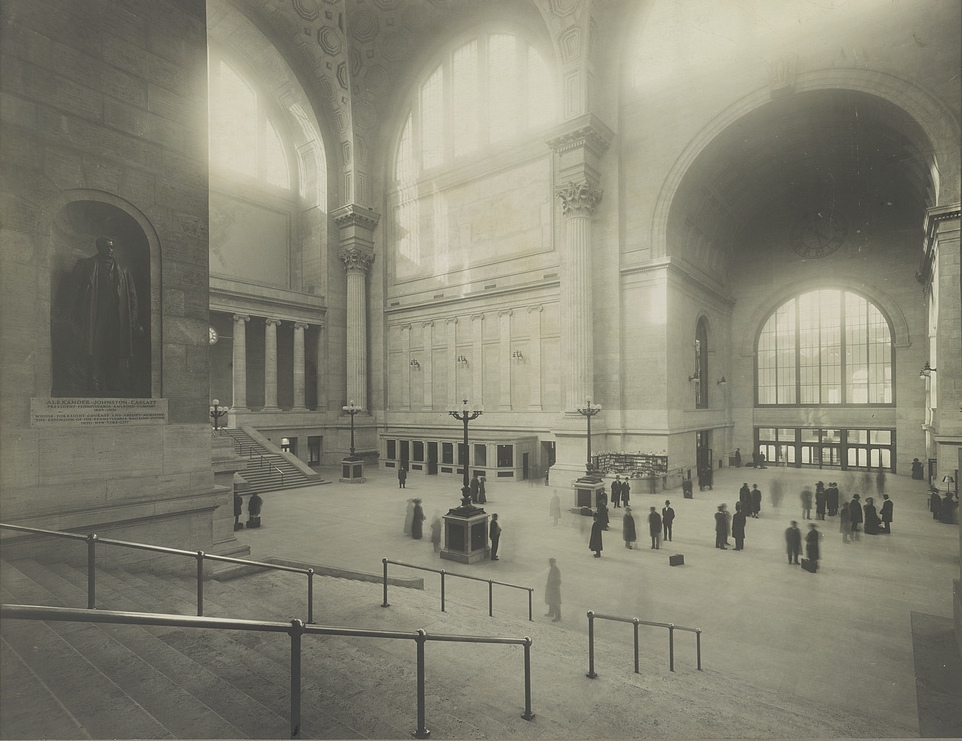
The Main Waiting Room, c. 1911, with bronze statue of PRR President Alexander Johnston Cassatt, in niche on left

Penn Station was the largest indoor space in New York City and one of the largest public spaces in the world. The Baltimore Sun said in April 2007 that the station was "as grand a corporate statement in stone, glass and sculpture as one could imagine." Historian Jill Jonnes called the original edifice a "great Doric temple to transportation". The interior design was inspired by several sources, including French and German railway stations; St. Peter's Basilica; and the Bank of England.

==== Entrance arcade ====
The main entrance on Seventh Avenue led to a shopping arcade that led westward into the station. The arcade measured 45 feet (14 m) wide by 225 feet (69 m) long, with a similar width to 32nd Street. Cassatt modeled the arcade after those in Milan and Naples, filling it with high-end boutiques and shops. The stores were included because Cassatt wanted to give passengers a cultural experience upon their arrival in New York. At the western end of the arcade, a statue of Alexander Johnston Cassatt stood in a niche on the northern wall where 40-foot-wide (12 m) stairs descended to a waiting room where passengers could wait for their trains. There was also a statue of PRR president Samuel Rea directly across from Cassatt's statue, on the southern wall, which was installed in 1930.

==== Main waiting room ====
The expansive waiting room, which spanned Penn Station's entire length from 31st to 33rd Streets, contained traveler amenities such as long benches, men's and women's smoking lounges, newspaper stands, telephone and telegraph booths, and baggage windows. The main waiting room was inspired by Roman structures such as the baths of Caracalla, Diocletan, and Titus. The room measured 314 feet 4 inches (95.81 m) long, 108 feet 8 inches (33.12 m) wide, and 150 feet (46 m) tall. (Note: Leland Roth gives a floor measurement of 102 by 278 feet (31 by 85 m) and a height of 147 feet (45 m) for the waiting room.; Richard Guy Wilson gives a floor measurement of 108 by 280 feet (33 by 85 m) and a height of 150 feet (46 m).; Elizabeth Macaulay-Lewis gives a floor measurement of 300 by 100 feet (91 by 30 m) and a height of 150 feet (46 m) tall.) Additional waiting rooms for men and women, each measuring 100 by 58 feet (30 by 18 m), were on either side of the main waiting room.

The room approximated the scale of St. Peter's Basilica in Rome. The lower walls were of travertine, while the upper walls were expressed in a steel framework clad in plaster, decorated to resemble the lower walls. The travertine was sourced from Campagna in Italy. This made Penn Station the first major American building to use travertine. The north and south walls each contained small colonnades of six Ionic columns, which flanked the staircases on those walls. There were also larger Corinthian columns on pedestals, measuring about 60 feet (18 m) tall from the tops of the pedestals to the tops of the capitals. There were eight lunette windows on top of the waiting room's walls: one each above the north and south walls and three each above the west and east walls. The lunettes had a radius of 38 feet 4 inches (11.68 m).

The artist Jules Guérin was commissioned to create six murals for Penn Station's waiting room. Each of his works were over 100 feet (30 m) high, placed above the tops of the Corinthian columns. The murals themselves measured 25 feet (7.6 m) tall and 70 feet (21 m) across. They contained maps depicting the extent of the PRR system.

==== Concourses ====
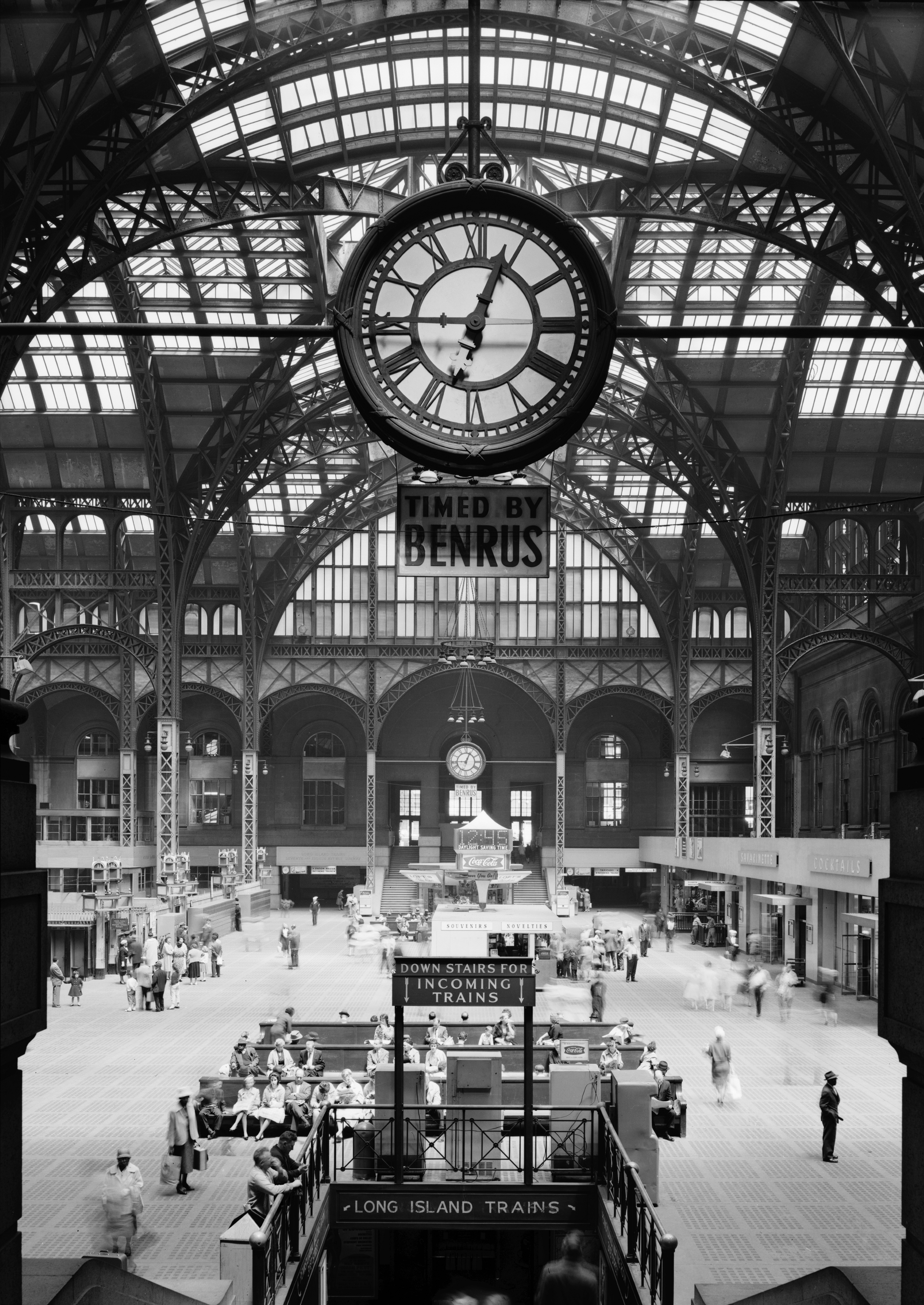
The large clock under the glass dome in the main concourse

Penn Station was one of the first rail stations to separate arriving and departing passengers on two concourses. Directly adjoining the waiting room was the main concourse area for departing passengers, with stairs directly to each platform. The floor area of the main concourse was variously cited as having floor measurements of 314.33 by 200 feet (95.81 by 60.96 m) or 208 by 315 feet (63 by 96 m). This concourse was covered by glass vaults that were held up by a plain steel framework. The glass roof measured 210 by 340 feet (64 by 104 m). McKim wanted to give "an appropriate transition" between the decorated nature of the waiting room and the utilitarian design of the tracks below. After the general shape of the vaults was determined, Purdy and Henderson designed the steelwork. The steel frame was less heavy at the top.

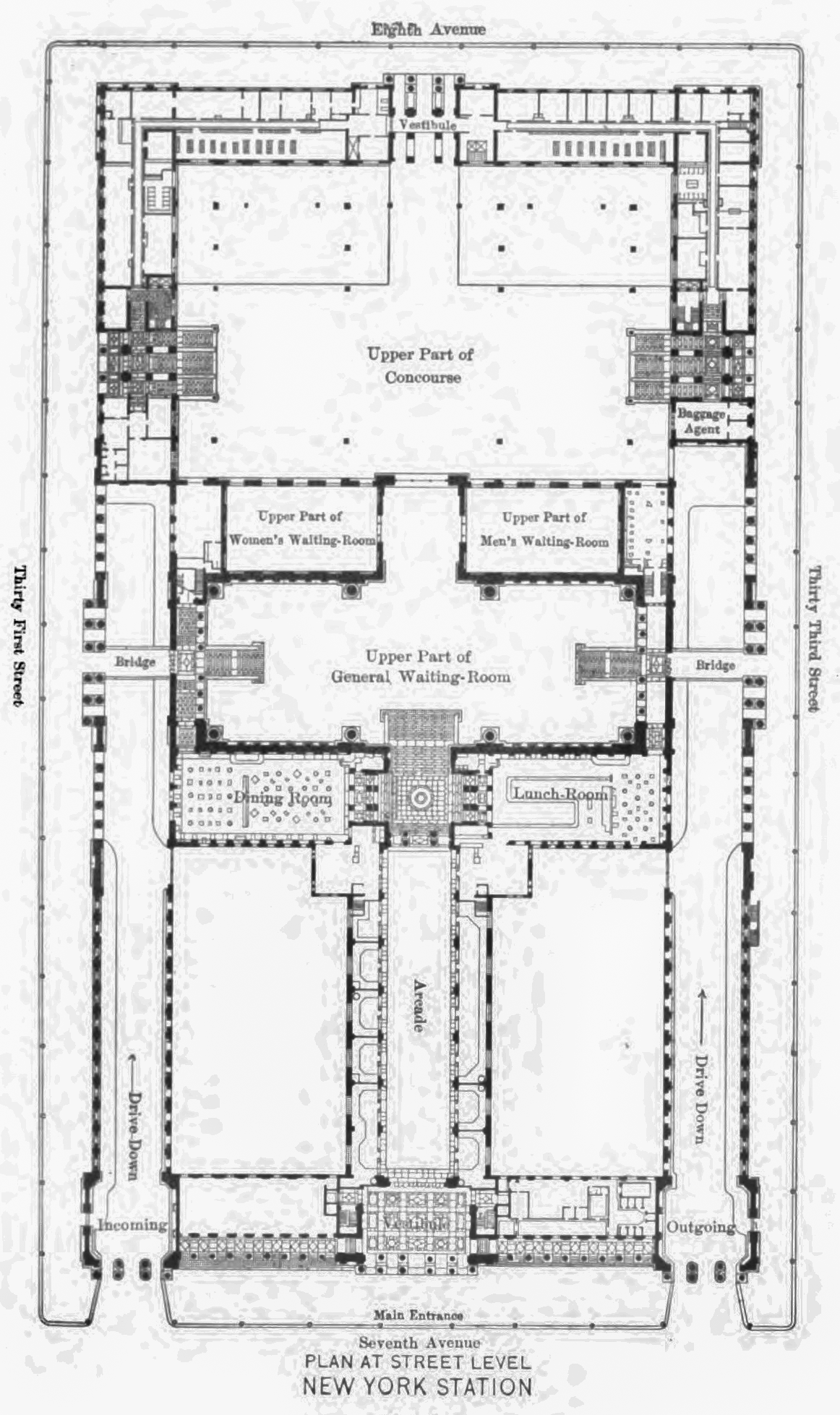
Street level floorplan

LIRR commuters could also use an entrance on the northern side, along 34th Street. The LIRR commuter concourse was 18 feet (5.5 m) above the tracks. There was an additional mezzanine level below the main concourse and waiting room for arriving passengers; it contained two smaller concourses, one for each railroad. The smaller northern mezzanine, used by the LIRR, connected to the LIRR platforms via short stairs and to the 34th Street entrance via escalators. The smaller southern mezzanine, used by the PRR, contained stairs and elevators between the PRR platforms and the level of the main concourse and waiting room.

Running from north to south was a separate exit concourse, measuring 60 feet (18 m) wide. This concourse led to both 31st and 33rd Streets and was subsequently connected to the subway stations on Seventh and Eighth Avenues. Two stairways and one elevator led to the exit concourse from each platform.

==== Platforms and tracks ====
The tracks were variously cited as being 36 feet (11 m) or 45 feet (14 m) below ground. At platform level, there were 21 tracks serving 11 platforms. LIRR trains had exclusive use of the station's northernmost four tracks, while the PRR was exclusively assigned the southernmost tracks. The two railroads shared the center tracks as necessary. An estimated 4 miles (6.4 km) of storage tracks in and around the station could store up to 386 railcars. The station contained 25 elevators for baggage and passenger use. The storage yards were located between Ninth and Tenth Avenues in a cut that was later covered and built over. The structure above it was supported by 650 steel columns, each supporting a weight of up to 1,658 short tons (1,480 long tons; 1,504 t).

East of the station, tracks 5–21 merged into two three-track tunnels, which then merged into the East River Tunnels' four tracks. West of the station, at approximately Ninth Avenue, all 21 tracks merged into the North River Tunnels' two tracks. Tracks 1–4, the station's southernmost tracks, terminated at bumper blocks at the east end of the station, so they could only be used by trains from New Jersey. Four switch towers, lettered from A to D, controlled train movements around the station. The main switch tower was Tower A, located between Eighth and Ninth Avenues; it still exists, although it is now located below the Farley Post Office.

== History ==
=== Planning ===
Before 1910, there was no direct rail link from points west of the Hudson River into Manhattan. The Pennsylvania Railroad (PRR)'s rail network terminated on the western side of the Hudson River, once known locally as the North River, at Exchange Place in Jersey City, New Jersey. Manhattan-bound passengers boarded ferries to cross the Hudson River for the final stretch of their journey. In 1896 alone, there were 94 million passengers traveling to Manhattan from railroad terminals in Jersey City. Ferries were not a viable solution in the long term; a ferry trip across the Hudson River lasted 20 minutes in good weather. The rival New York Central Railroad (NYC)'s line transported passengers from the Hudson Valley in the city's north, ran along Park Avenue in Manhattan, and terminated at Grand Central Depot (later Grand Central Terminal) at 42nd Street and Park Avenue. PRR president Alexander Johnston Cassatt wanted to build a terminal that surpassed Grand Central Depot in scale.

==== Early proposals ====
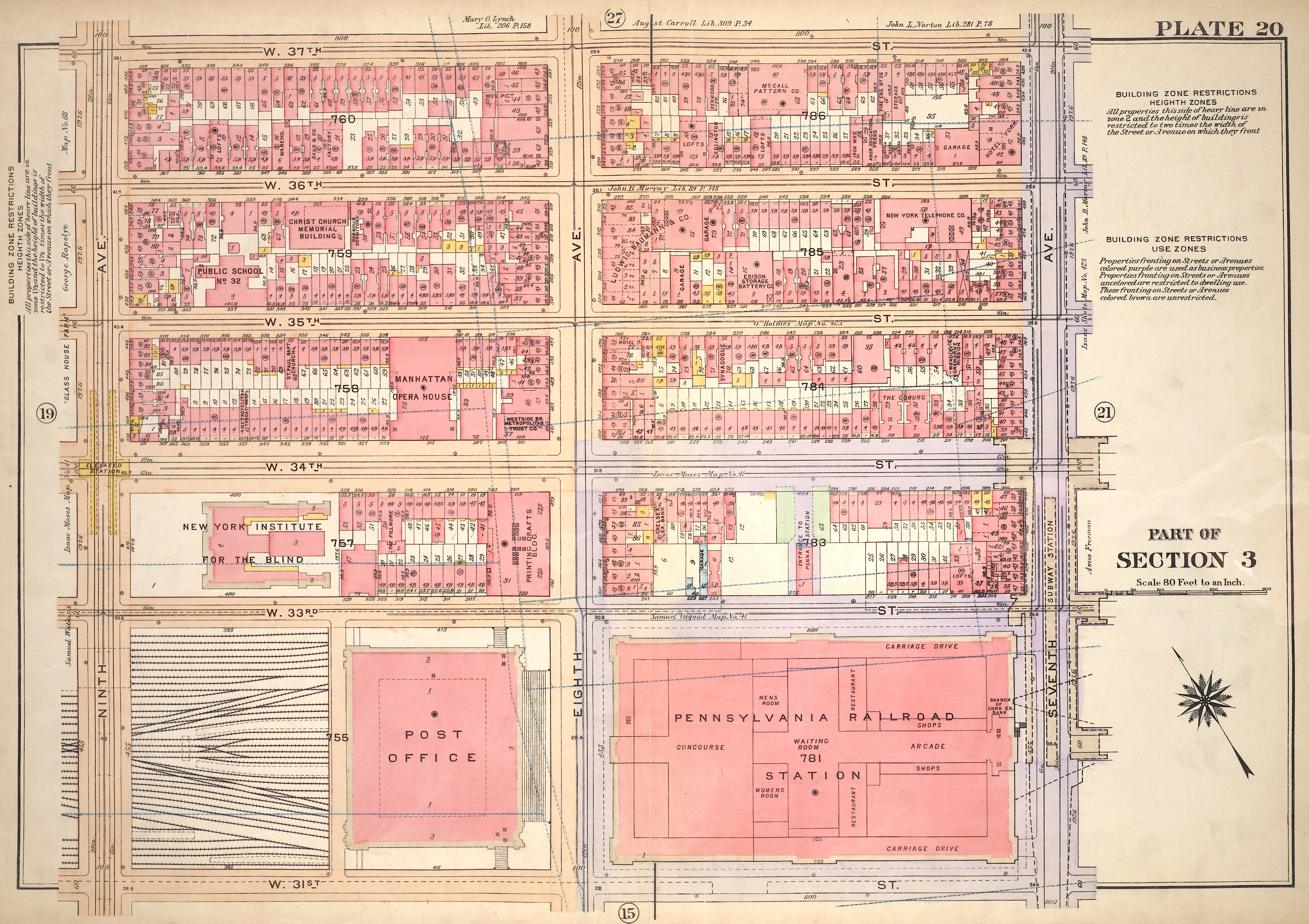
Pennsylvania Station, Plate 20 from: Bromley, George W. and Bromley, Walter S. Atlas of the City of New York Borough of Manhattan. Volume Two. (Philadelphia: G. W. Bromley and Co., 1920)

Many proposals for a cross-Hudson connection were advanced in the late 19th century, but financial panics in the 1870s and 1890s scared off potential investors. In any event, none of the proposals advanced during this time were considered feasible. The PRR considered building a rail bridge across the Hudson, but the state of New York insisted that a cross-Hudson bridge had to be a joint project with other New Jersey railroads, which were not interested. The alternative was to tunnel under the river, but steam locomotives could not use such a tunnel due to the accumulation of pollution in a closed space, and the New York State Legislature prohibited steam locomotives in Manhattan after July 1, 1908.

The idea of a Midtown Manhattan railroad hub was first formulated in 1901, when the Pennsylvania Railroad took interest in a new railroad approach recently completed in Paris. In the Parisian railroad scheme, electric locomotives were substituted for steam locomotives prior to the final approach into the city. Cassatt adapted this method for the New York City area in the form of the New York Tunnel Extension project. He created and led the overall planning effort for it. The PRR, which had been working with the Long Island Rail Road (LIRR) on the Tunnel Extension plans, made plans to acquire majority control of the LIRR so one new terminal could be built in Manhattan, rather than two. The project was to include New York Penn Station; the North River Tunnels, crossing the Hudson River to the west; and the East River Tunnels, crossing the East River to the east. Cassatt's vision for the terminal itself was inspired by the Gare d'Orsay, a Beaux-Arts style station in Paris.

The original proposal for the station, which was published in June 1901, called for the construction of a bridge across the Hudson River between 45th and 50th Streets in Manhattan, as well as two closely spaced terminals for the LIRR and PRR. This would allow passengers to travel between Long Island and New Jersey without having to switch trains. In December 1901, the plans were modified so that the PRR would construct the North River Tunnels under the Hudson River, instead of a bridge over it. The PRR cited costs and land value as a reason for constructing a tunnel rather than a bridge, since the cost of a tunnel would be one-third that of a bridge. The New York Tunnel Extension was quickly opposed by the New York City Board of Rapid Transit Commissioners who objected that they would not have jurisdiction over the new tunnels, as well as from the Interborough Rapid Transit Company, which saw the New York Tunnel Extension as a potential competitor to its as-yet-incomplete rapid transit service. The city had initially declined to give the PRR a franchise because city officials believed that the PRR needed to grant thirteen concessions to protect city interests; the PRR ultimately conceded to nine of the city's requests. The project was approved by the New York City Board of Aldermen in December 1902 by a 41–36 vote.

==== Approved plans ====
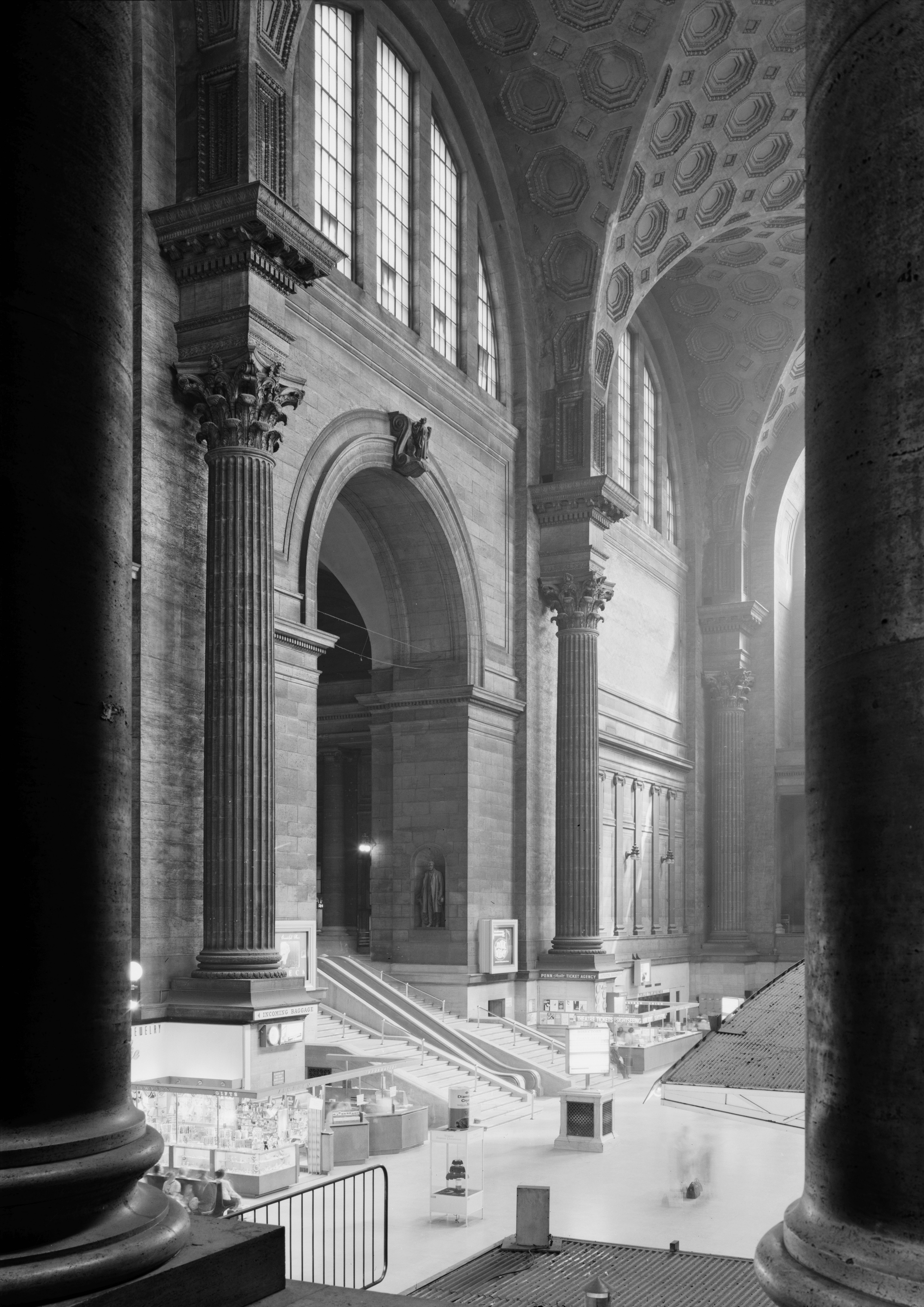
The Corinthian columns of New York Penn Station's Main Waiting Room

In April 1902, Cassatt sent a telegram to Charles McKim of the New York architectural firm McKim, Mead & White. According to one account, when McKim received the telegram, he said: "I suppose President Cassatt wants a new stoop for his house". After McKim talked with Cassatt, the architect learned that he had received the commission for the new Pennsylvania Station. McKim was pleased to receive the commission, writing to his friend Daniel Burnham, who had congratulated him. The historian Mosette Broderick wrote that McKim faced an "internal conflict" because Burnham and Cassatt had collaborated on the development of Chicago Union Station, which indicated that Cassatt had some type of "loyalty" to Burnham. McKim may have received the commission for New York Penn Station because of his friendship with Daniel Smith Newhall, the PRR's purchasing agent, who had praised McKim's work.

The plans approved in December 1902 called for an "immense passenger station" on the east side of Eighth Avenue between 31st and 33rd Streets in Manhattan. The project was expected to cost over $100 million. Though the tracks were to be entirely underground, the plans had to resemble a typical railway station while also serving as a major gateway to New York City. The new design also had to compete with that of the new Grand Central Terminal, designed by Reed & Stem. McKim studied the role of public buildings in Ancient Rome, including the Baths of Diocletian. Cassatt and McKim collaborated closely to define the structure of the station. Their original plan called for a structure measuring 1,500 feet (460 m) long by 500 feet (150 m) wide, with three floors open to passengers and 25 tracks. Cassatt had wanted to build a hotel above the station, but McKim had dismissed the proposal, having been opposed to high-rise buildings. According to architectural writer Leland Roth, the absence of the hotel eliminated income that could have helped the station's preservation in later years.

As part of the station's construction, the PRR proposed that the United States Postal Service construct a post office across from the station on the west side of Eighth Avenue. In February 1903, the U.S. government accepted the PRR's proposal and made plans to construct what would later become the Farley Post Office, which was also designed by McKim, Mead & White. The PRR would also build a train storage yard in Queens east of Penn Station, to be used by both PRR trains from the west and LIRR trains from the east. The yard was to store passenger-train cars at the beginning or end of their trips, as well as to reverse the direction of the locomotives that pulled these train cars.

=== Construction ===
==== Land acquisition ====
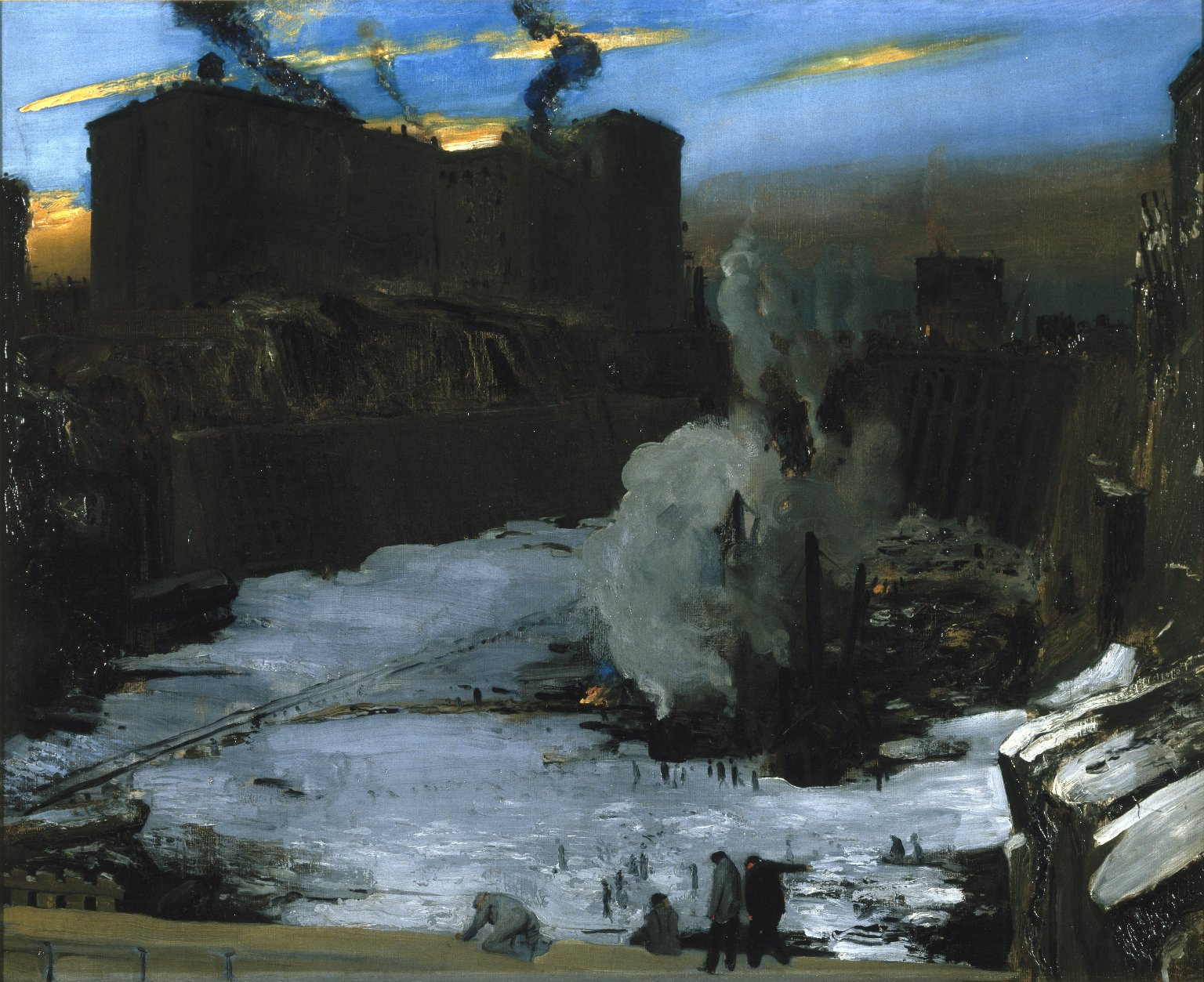
Depiction of the excavation of the Pennsylvania Station foundation, by George Wesley Bellows

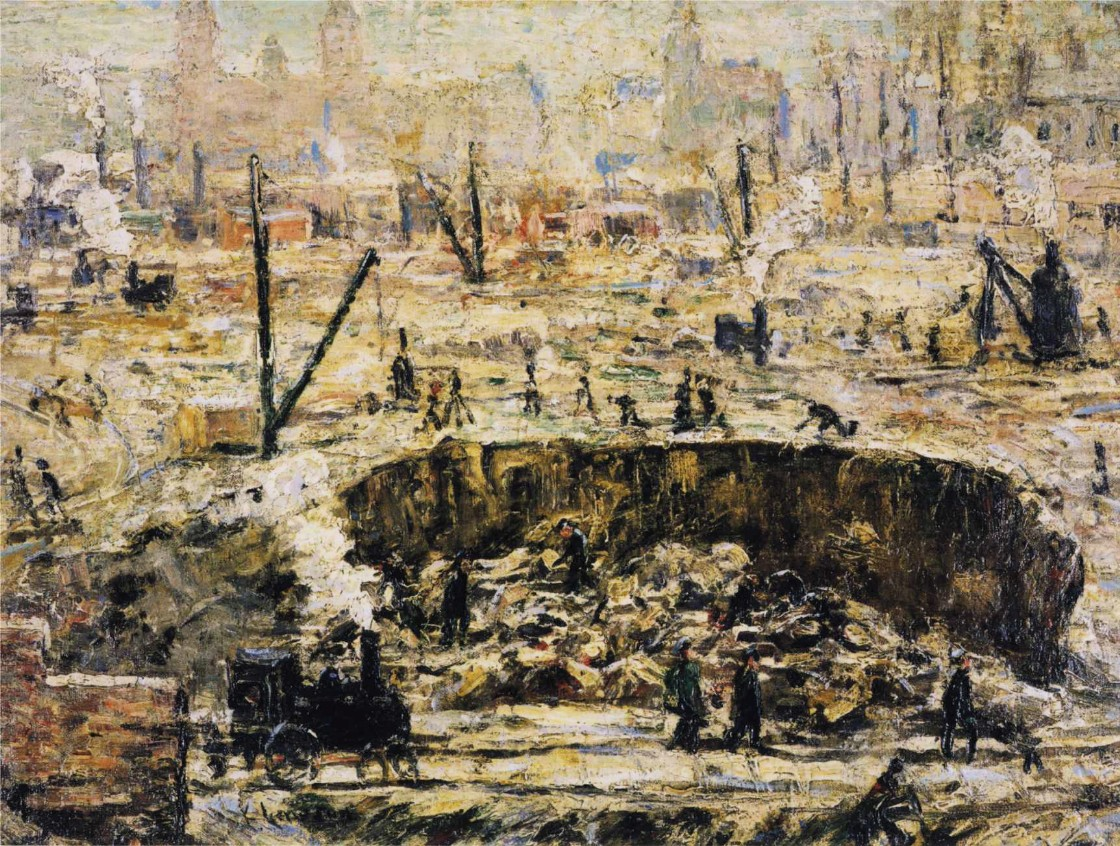
Depiction of the excavation of the station foundation, by Ernest Lawson

Land purchases for the station started in late 1901 or early 1902. The PRR purchased a site bounded by Seventh and Ninth Avenues between 31st and 33rd Streets. This site was chosen over other sites farther east, such as Herald Square, because these parts of Manhattan were already congested. Penn Station proper would be located along the eastern part of the site between Seventh and Eighth Avenue. The northwestern block, bounded by Eighth Avenue, Ninth Avenue, 32nd Street, and 33rd Street, was not part of the original plan.

The condemnation of 17 city-owned buildings on the station's future site, an area of four blocks, began in June 1903. All 304 parcels within the four-block area, which were collectively owned by between 225 and 250 entities, had been purchased by November 1903. The PRR purchased land west of Ninth Avenue in April 1904, such that it owned all the land between Seventh and Tenth Avenues from 31st to 33rd Street. This land would allow the PRR to build extra railroad switches for the tracks around Penn Station. The PRR also purchased land along the north side of the future station between 33rd and 34th Streets, so the company could create a pedestrian walkway leading directly to 34th Street, a major crosstown thoroughfare. The properties between 33rd and 34th Street that the PRR had purchased were transferred to PRR ownership in 1908. Clearing the site entailed "displacing thousands of residents from the largely African-American community in what was once known as the Tenderloin district in Manhattan."

==== Early work ====
The details of the track layout were finalized by 1904. A $5 million contract to excavate the site was awarded that June, marking the start of the construction. Overall, some 500 buildings had to be demolished to make way for the station. By early 1905, contractors were installing granite in the station's lower levels, and an adjacent power station on 31st Street was finished. During this time, McKim's health began to decline as he experienced stress in his personal and professional life. McKim withdrew from the project in 1906 as his health worsened, and Richardson replaced him as lead architect.

Even as excavation proceeded, the federal government was still deciding whether to build a post office next to the PRR station. The PRR planned to turn over the air rights to the blocks between Eighth and Ninth Avenues to the federal government once excavations were completed. However, the PRR would still own the land below the post office leading some Congress members to oppose the post office plan, as they believed that the government would only own "a chunk of space in the air" above the tracks. The Postmaster of New York City, William Russell Willcox, ultimately approved the post office anyway. McKim, Mead & White was selected to design the post office in 1908. By this time, the excavations were near completion and the structural steel for the post office building was being laid.

==== Completion and opening ====
The North River and East River Tunnels ran almost in a straight line between Queens and New Jersey, interrupted only by the proposed Pennsylvania Railroad station. The technology for the tunnels connecting to Penn Station was so innovative that the PRR shipped an actual 23-foot (7.0 m) diameter section of the new East River Tunnels to the Jamestown Exposition in Norfolk, Virginia, in 1907, to celebrate the 300th anniversary of the nearby founding of the colony at Jamestown. The same tube, with an inscription indicating that it had been displayed at the Exposition, was later installed under water and remains in use. Construction was completed on the Hudson River tunnels on October 9, 1906, and on the East River tunnels on March 18, 1908. Construction also progressed on Penn Station during this time. Workers began laying the stonework for the station in June 1908; they had completed it thirteen months later.

New York Penn Station was officially declared complete on August 29, 1910. A small portion of Penn Station was opened nearly two weeks later, on September 8, in conjunction with the opening of the East River Tunnels. As a result, LIRR riders gained direct railroad service to Manhattan. Prior to the opening of Penn Station, LIRR riders entered Manhattan via the 34th Street Ferry Terminal, where they could transfer to an elevated shuttle station. The rest of the station opened on November 27, 1910. One hundred thousand people visited the station during its first day of full service, excluding the 25,000 commuters and intercity riders. With the station's full opening, the PRR became the only railroad to enter New York City from the south. All of the architectural details were completed by October 1911.

At the station's completion, the total project cost to the Pennsylvania Railroad for the station and associated tunnels was $114 million (equivalent to $2.84 billion in 2025), according to an Interstate Commerce Commission report. The railroad paid tribute to Cassatt, who died in 1906, with a statue designed by Adolph Alexander Weinman in the station's grand arcade, subsequently moved to the Railroad Museum of Pennsylvania after the station's demolition. An inscription below it read:

Alexander Johnston Cassatt · President, Pennsylvania Railroad Company · 1899–1906 · Whose foresight, courage and ability achieved · the extension of the Pennsylvania Railroad System · into New York City

=== Operation ===
==== Early years ====
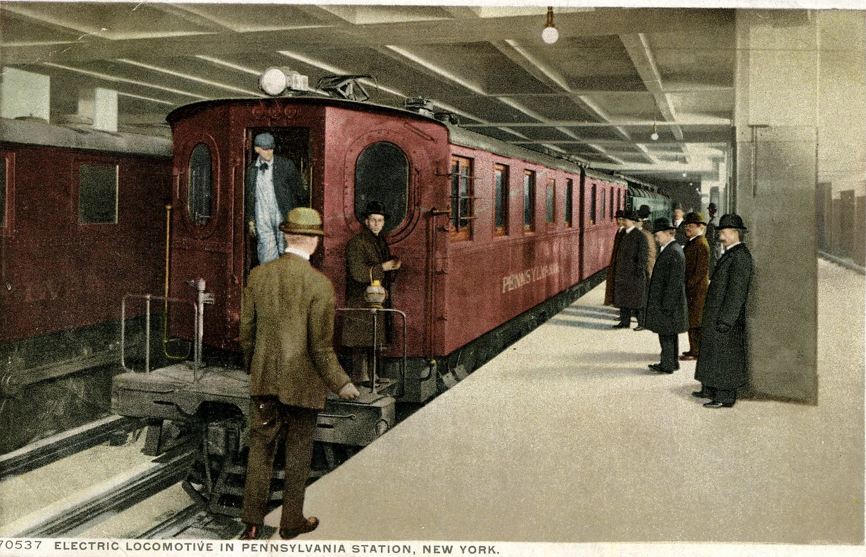
A Pennsylvania Railroad class DD1 electric locomotive arrives at Penn Station, c. 1910

When Penn Station opened, it had a capacity of 144 trains per hour on its 21 tracks and 11 platforms. At the start of operations, there were 1,000 trains scheduled every weekday: of these, 600 were LIRR trains, while the other 400 were PRR trains. The commuting times of LIRR riders were cut by up to a half-hour. The station was so heavily used that the PRR soon added 51 trains to its daily schedule. The station also served New Haven trains to Westchester County and Connecticut after the Hell Gate Bridge opened in 1917. During half a century of operation, many intercity passenger trains arrived and departed daily to Chicago and St. Louis, where passengers could make connections to other railroads. Along with Long Island Rail Road trains, Penn Station saw trains of the New Haven and the Lehigh Valley Railroads. A side effect of the tunneling project was to open the city up to the suburbs, and, within 10 years of opening, two-thirds of the daily passengers coming through Penn Station were commuters. Richard Guy Wilson wrote that "in catching or meeting a train at Pennsylvania Station one became part of a pageant".

The station put the Pennsylvania Railroad at a comparative advantage to its competitors offering service to the west and south. The Baltimore & Ohio (B&O), Central of New Jersey (CNJ), Erie, and the Lackawanna railroads began their routes at terminals in New Jersey, requiring travelers bound for New York City to use ferries or the interstate Hudson and Manhattan Railroad to traverse the Hudson River. (Note: The B&O and CNJ terminated at the Central Railroad of New Jersey Terminal in Jersey City. The Erie and the Lackawanna terminated at Hoboken Terminal in Hoboken. The Erie also used the Pavonia Terminal in Jersey City at one point.) During World War I and the early 1920s, the rival B&O passenger trains to Washington, D.C., Chicago, and St. Louis also used Penn Station, initially by order of the United States Railroad Administration, until the Pennsylvania Railroad terminated the B&O's access in 1926. Atypically for a public building, Penn Station was well maintained during its heyday. Such was the station's status that whenever the President of the United States arrived in New York by rail, he would arrive and depart on tracks 11 and 12. Royalty and leaders of other countries also traveled via Penn Station.

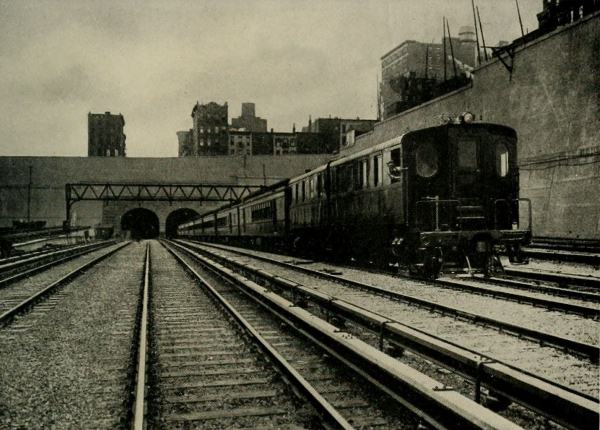
A train approaching the station from New Jersey, 1910

Over the next few decades, alterations were made to Penn Station to increase its capacity. The LIRR concourse, waiting room, amenities and platforms were expanded. Connections were provided to the New York City Subway stations at Seventh Avenue and Eighth Avenue. The electrification of Penn Station was initially third rail, which provided 600 volts of direct current. It was later changed to 11,000-volt alternating current overhead catenary when electrification of PRR's mainline was extended to Washington, D.C., in the early 1930s. The expansion of electrification also allowed the PRR to begin running electric-powered commuter trains from Trenton via Newark starting in 1933; previously, steam-powered commuter trains continued to originate and terminate at Exchange Place. By 1935, Penn Station had served over a billion passengers.

A Greyhound Lines bus terminal was built to the north of Penn Station, facing 34th Street, in 1935. However, within a decade, the bus terminal had gone into decline, and was frequented by low-level criminals and the homeless. The Greyhound bus terminal soon saw competition from the Port Authority Bus Terminal, located seven blocks north of Penn Station. Opened in 1950, it was intended to consolidate bus service. Greyhound resisted for almost a decade afterward, but by 1962 it had closed the Penn Station bus terminal and moved to the Port Authority Bus Terminal.

==== Decline ====
The station was busiest during World War II: in 1945, more than 100 million passengers traveled through Penn Station. The station's decline came soon afterward with the beginning of the Jet Age and the construction of the Interstate Highway System. The PRR recorded its first-ever annual operating losses in 1947, and intercity rail passenger volumes continued to decline dramatically over the next decade. By the 1950s, its ornate pink granite exterior had become coated with grime. During the decade, the PRR relied increasingly on real estate to keep it profitable.

A renovation in the late 1950s covered some of the grand columns with plastic and blocked off the spacious central hallway with the "Clamshell", a new ticket office designed by Lester C. Tichy. Architectural critic Lewis Mumford wrote in The New Yorker in 1958 that "nothing further that could be done to the station could damage it". Advertisements surrounded the station's Seventh Avenue concourse, while stores and restaurants were crammed around the Eighth Avenue side's mezzanine. A layer of dirt covered the interior and exterior of the structure, and the pink granite was stained with gray. Another architectural critic, Ada Louise Huxtable, wrote in The New York Times in 1963: "The tragedy is that our own times not only could not produce such a building, but cannot even maintain it."

=== Demolition ===
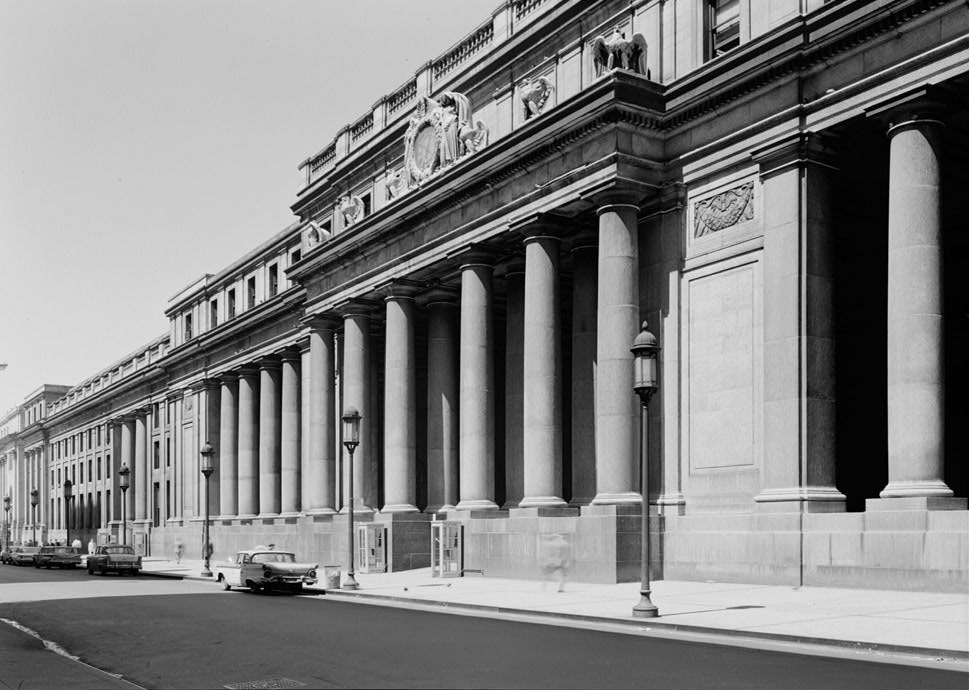
Seen in 1962

The Pennsylvania Railroad optioned the air rights of New York Penn Station to real estate developer William Zeckendorf in 1954. He had previously suggested that the two-block site of the main building could be used for a "world trade center". The option allowed for the demolition of the main building and train shed, which could be replaced by an office and sports complex. The station's underground platforms and tracks would not be modified, but the station's mezzanines would be reconfigured. A blueprint for a "Palace of Progress" was released in 1955 but was not acted upon.

Plans for the new Madison Square Garden above Penn Station were announced in 1962 by Irving Mitchell Felt, the president of Graham-Paige, the company that purchased the air rights to Penn Station. In exchange for the air rights, the Pennsylvania Railroad would get a brand-new, air-conditioned, smaller station completely below street level at no cost, and a 25 percent stake in the new Madison Square Garden Complex. A 28-story hotel and 34-story office building, now part of Penn Plaza, would be built on the eastern side of the block, facing Seventh Avenue. The arena proper would take up most of the block, facing Eighth Avenue to the west. At the time, one argument made in favor of the old Penn Station's demolition was that the cost of maintaining the structure had become prohibitive. Its grand scale made the PRR devote a "fortune" to its upkeep, and the head house's exterior had become somewhat grimy. Those who opposed demolition considered whether it made sense to preserve a building, intended to be a cost-effective and functional piece of the city's infrastructure, simply as a monument to the past. As a New York Times editorial critical of the demolition noted at the time, "any city gets what it wants, is willing to pay for, and ultimately deserves."

The architectural community in general was surprised by the announcement of the head house's demolition. Modern architects rushed to save the ornate building, although it was contrary to their own styles. They called the station a treasure and chanted "Don't Amputate – Renovate" at rallies. Despite the controversy generated over the demolition, Felt stated that he "believed that the gain from the new buildings and sports center would more than offset any aesthetic loss." He elaborated, "Fifty years from now, when it's time for [Madison Square Garden] to be torn down, there will be a new group of architects who will protest." Despite large public opposition to Penn Station's demolition, the New York City Department of City Planning voted in January 1963 to start demolishing the station that summer. Architects protested against the decision, but to no effect.

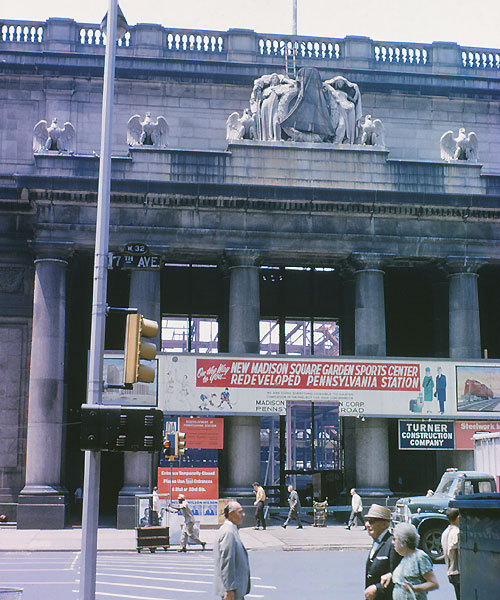
The demolition of the station in 1966

Under the leadership of PRR president Stuart T. Saunders (who later headed Penn Central Transportation), demolition of the above-ground station house began on October 28, 1963. A giant steel deck was placed above the tracks and platforms, allowing rail service to continue with only minor disruptions. This was possible because most of the rail infrastructure, including the waiting room, concourses and platforms, was below street level. Around five hundred columns were sunk into the platforms, while passengers were routed around work areas surrounded by plywood. Madison Square Garden and two office towers were built above the extensively renovated concourses and waiting area.

The first girders for Madison Square Garden were placed in late 1965, and, by mid-1966, much of the station had been demolished except for the Seventh Avenue entrance. By late 1966, much of the new station had been built. There were three new entrances: one from 31st Street and Eighth Avenue, another from 33rd Street and Eighth Avenue, and a third from a driveway running mid-block between Seventh and Eighth Avenues from 31st to 33rd Streets. Permanent electronic signs were being erected, shops were being renovated, new escalators were being installed, and platforms that were temporarily closed during renovations had been reopened. Demolition of the old station was completed the same year. A 1968 advertisement depicted architect Charles Luckman's model of the final plan for the Madison Square Garden Center complex.

==== Impact ====
Although the demolition of the head house was justified as progressive at a time of declining rail passenger service, it also created international outrage. One of the most outspoken critics was Huxtable, who published numerous editorials in The New York Times decrying the demolition of the station. As the dismantling of the structure began, The New York Times' editorial board wrote, "Until the first blow fell, no one was convinced that Penn Station really would be demolished, or that New York would permit this monumental act of vandalism against one of the largest and finest landmarks of its age of Roman elegance." New York Times reporter Eddie Hausner's photograph of the sculpture Day by Adolph Alexander Weinman, lying in a landfill in the New Jersey Meadowlands, inspired New Jersey Conservation and Economic Development Commissioner Robert A. Roe to salvage some of the head house's sculptures. New York Times architecture critic Michael Kimmelman compared the demolition of the head house unfavorably to that of Lenox Library, destroyed to make way for the Frick Collection, or the old Waldorf–Astoria, razed for the construction of the Empire State Building. He claimed that it broke a long tradition of New Yorkers accepting that "what replaced a beloved building would be as good or better."

The controversy over the original head house's demolition is cited as a catalyst for the architectural preservation movement in the United States, particularly in New York City. In 1965, two years after Penn Station's demolition commenced, the city passed a landmarks preservation act, thereby creating the New York City Landmarks Preservation Commission (LPC). New York City's other major railroad station, Grand Central Terminal, was also proposed for demolition in 1968 by its owner, Penn Central. Grand Central Terminal was ultimately preserved by the LPC, despite an unsuccessful challenge from Penn Central in 1978.

=== Present day ===
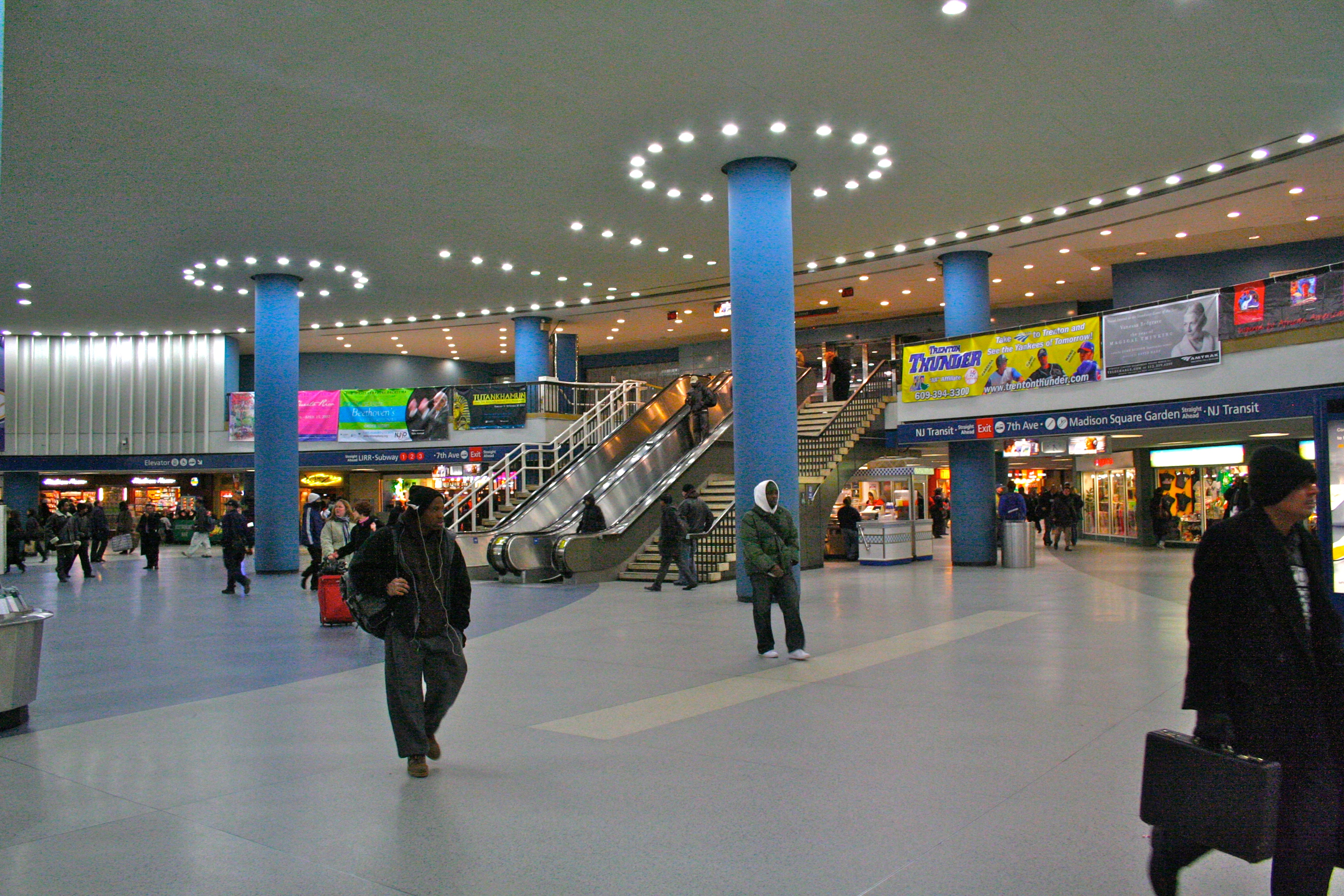
Main concourse of the current station

The replacement Penn Station was built underneath Madison Square Garden at 33rd Street and Two Penn Plaza. The station spans three levels, with the concourses on the upper two levels and the train platforms on the lowest level. The two levels of concourses, while original to the 1910 station, were renovated extensively during the construction of Madison Square Garden and expanded in subsequent decades. The tracks and platforms are also largely original, except for newer track connections to the West Side Rail Yard and the Amtrak Empire Corridor serving Albany and Buffalo. The station is arranged into separate concourses for Amtrak, NJ Transit (which operates the former PRR commuter lines from New Jersey), and the LIRR.

General reception of the replacement station has been largely negative. Comparing the new and old stations, Yale architectural historian Vincent Scully once wrote, "One entered the city like a god; one scuttles in now like a rat." Despite having undergone improvements since the 1960s, Penn Station is criticized as a low-ceilinged "catacomb" lacking charm, especially when compared to the larger and more ornate Grand Central Terminal. The New York Times, in a November 2007 editorial supporting development of an enlarged railroad station, said that "Amtrak's beleaguered customers ... now scurry through underground rooms bereft of light or character."

Times transit reporter Michael M. Grynbaum wrote that Penn Station was "the ugly stepchild of the city's two great rail terminals." Along similar lines, Michael Kimmelman wrote in 2019 that while downsizing Penn Station and moving it underground may have made a modicum of sense at the time, in hindsight it was a sign that New York was "disdainful of its gloried architectural past." He also claimed that the remodeled station is not commensurate with its status as the main rail gateway to New York.

The General Post Office, directly west of the station, remained largely intact through the 20th century; the LPC had designated the post office as one of the city's earliest landmarks in 1966. In the early 1990s, U.S. Senator Daniel Patrick Moynihan began promoting a plan to build a replica of the historic Penn Station, since he had shined shoes in the original station during the Great Depression. He proposed erecting it in the nearby Farley Post Office building. The project, later renamed "Moynihan Train Hall", was split into two phases. The West End Concourse, opened in the eastern part of the former post office in June 2017. The second phase, an expansion of Penn Station's facilities into parts of the post office building, opened in January 2021.

== Surviving elements ==
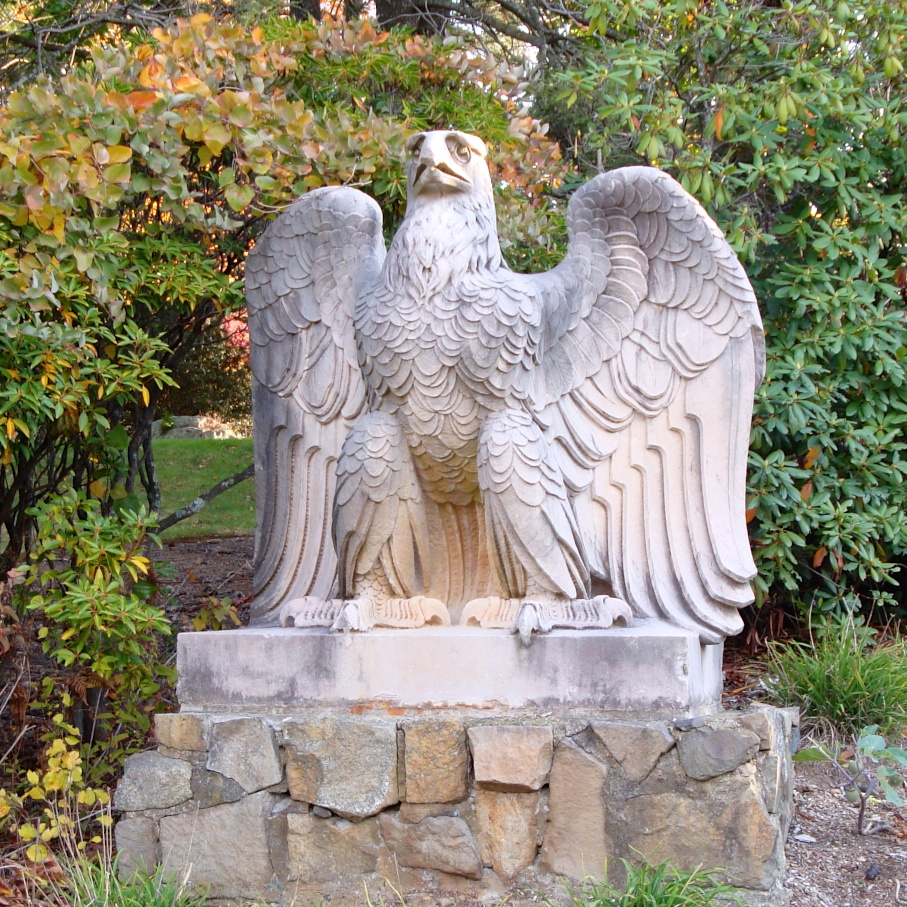
Original eagle by Adolph Weinman now at Skylands in Ringwood, New Jersey

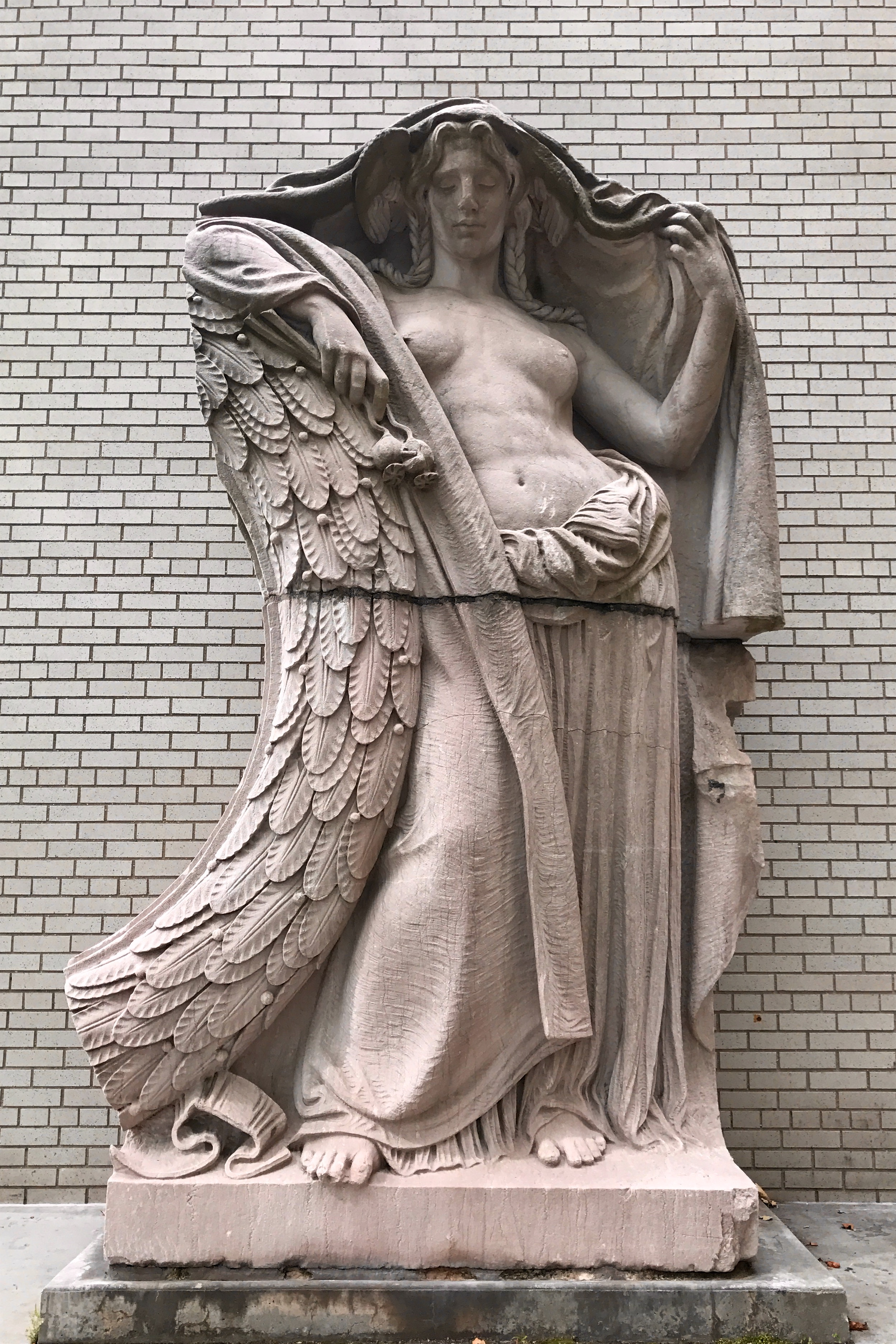
Weinman's Night in the Brooklyn Museum

Following the demolition of the original Penn Station, many of its architectural elements were lost or buried in the New Jersey Meadowlands. Some elements were salvaged and relocated. Additional architectural elements remain in the present-day station: some were covered over, while others remain visible throughout the current station.

=== Ornaments and art ===
==== Eagles ====
Of the 22 eagle sculptures around the station exterior, the locations of all 14 larger, freestanding eagles are known. Three remain in New York City: two at Penn Plaza along Seventh Avenue flanking the main entrance, and one at Cooper Union, Adolph Weinman's alma mater. Cooper Union's eagle had been located in the courtyard of the Albert Nerken School of Engineering at 51 Astor Place, but was relocated in the summer of 2009, along with the engineering school, to a new academic building at 41 Cooper Square. This eagle is no longer visible from the street, as it is located on the building's eighth-floor green roof.

Three eagles are on Long Island: two at the United States Merchant Marine Academy in Kings Point, and one at the LIRR station in Hicksville, New York. Four reside on the Market Street Bridge in Philadelphia, Pennsylvania, across from that city's 30th Street Station. There are also individual eagles at four locations. One is positioned near the end zone at the football field of Hampden-Sydney College near Farmville, Virginia. Another is located on the grounds of the National Zoo in Washington, D.C. The other individual eagles are located in Vinalhaven, Maine, as well as at the Valley Forge Military Academy in Valley Forge, Pennsylvania.

Of the eight smaller eagles, which surrounded the four Day and Night sculptures, four are accounted for. Two are located at the entrance to Skylands in Ringwood, New Jersey. The other two are part of the Eagle Scout Memorial Fountain in Kansas City, Missouri. The family of Albert Fritsch, a PRR mechanic, owns a fragment of another eagle.

==== Day and Night sculptures ====
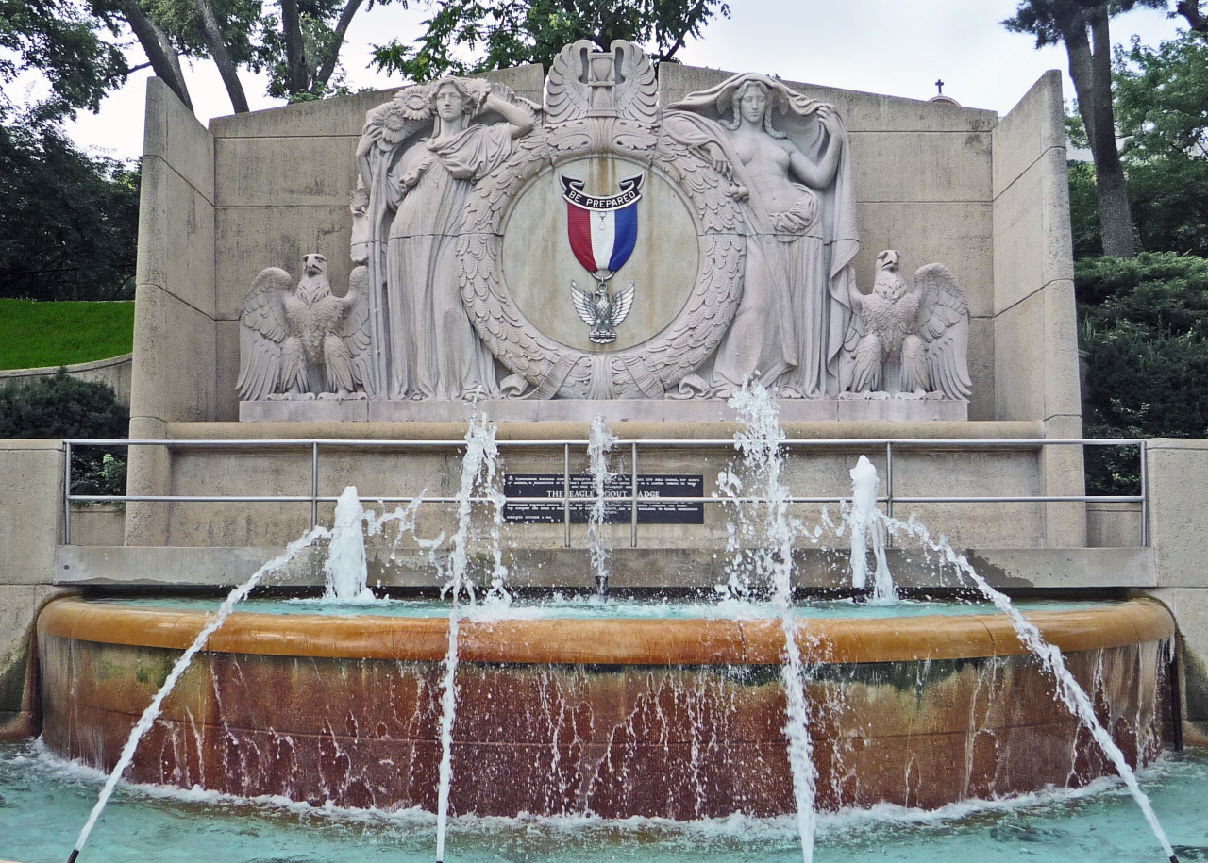
The Eagle Scout Memorial Fountain, Kansas City, Missouri, contains a complete, intact Day and Night sculpture group from the station, including the small eagles and winged hourglass.

Three pairs of the Day and Night sculptures have been located. One of the four Day and Night sculptures still survives fully intact at Kansas City's Eagle Scout Memorial Fountain. A Night sculpture was moved to the sculpture garden at the Brooklyn Museum. The other pairs of Day and Night sculptures were discarded in the Meadowlands. One of these pairs, recovered by Robert A. Roe, was stored at Ringwood State Park in Passaic County, New Jersey.

In the late 1990s, NJ Transit wanted to install the sculptures at Newark Broad Street station. However, this did not happen, and a writer for the website Untapped Cities found the sculpture pair in a Newark parking lot in mid-2017. Another Day sculpture was found in 1998 at the Con-Agg Recycling Corporation plant in the Bronx; the damaged sculpture had been stored at the recycling plant since at least the mid-1990s.

==== Other artifacts ====
The Brooklyn Museum also owns part of one of the station's Iconic columns as well as some plaques from the station. The largest piece of the station that is known to have been salvaged, a 35-foot (11 m) Doric column, was transported upstate to Woodridge, New York, c. 1963. The Doric column had been intended for an unbuilt college in Woodridge, the Verrazano College. However, the column remained in Woodridge once plans for the college were canceled, since it was very unwieldy to bring the column back downstate. In addition, eighteen of the station's 84 columns were supposed to be placed in Battery Park in Lower Manhattan. However, the columns were dumped in a landfill in New Jersey instead.

The statue of Samuel Rea still exists and is located outside the modern Penn Station entrance on Seventh Avenue. Six bronze torchères from the waiting room were reinstalled in front of the Cathedral of St. John the Divine when the station building was demolished. By the 1990s, these lampposts had been moved to the cathedral's crypt due to deterioration.

=== Layout features ===
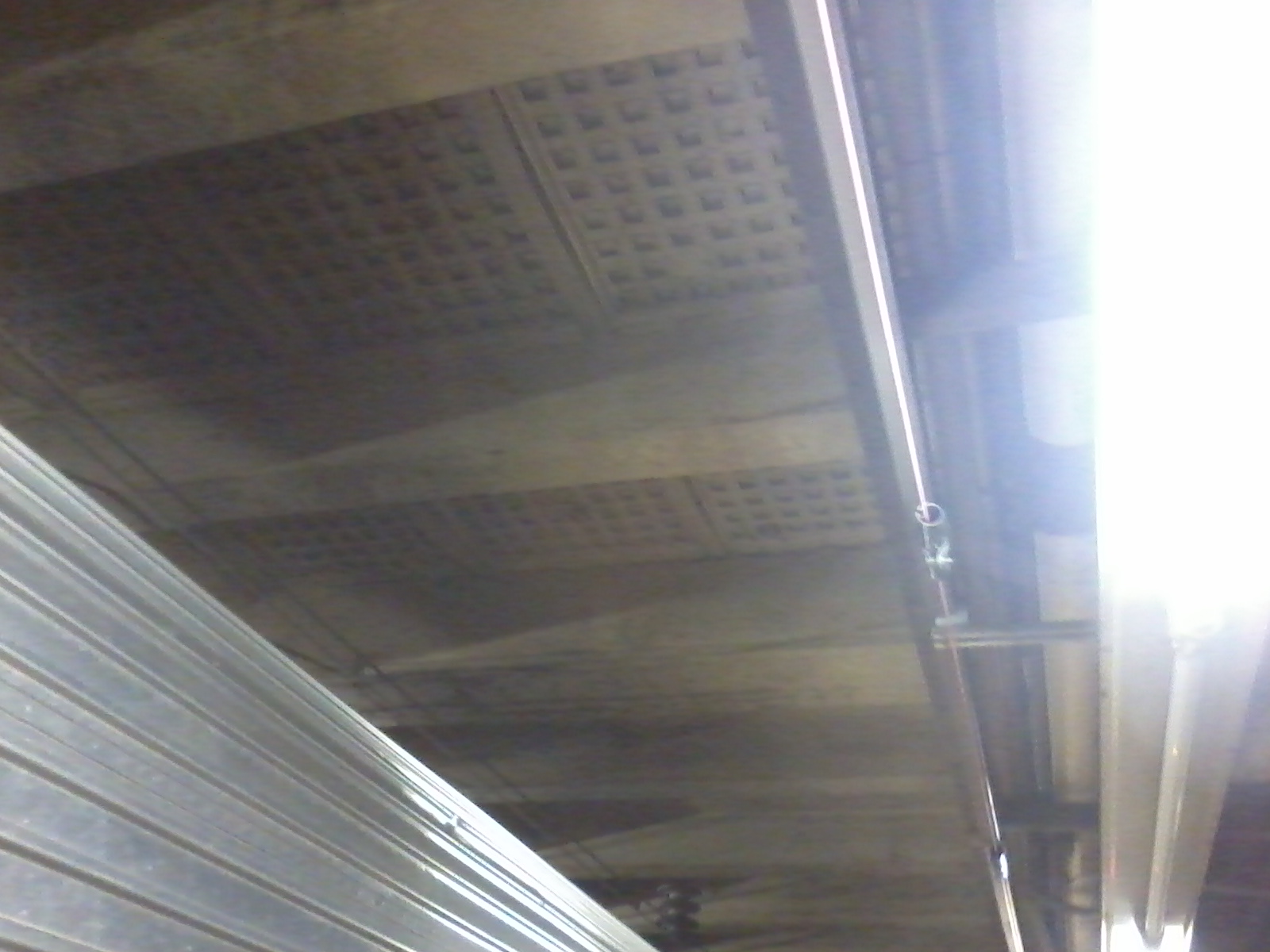
Original vault light panels buried under the modern concourse flooring, from below, on the track level

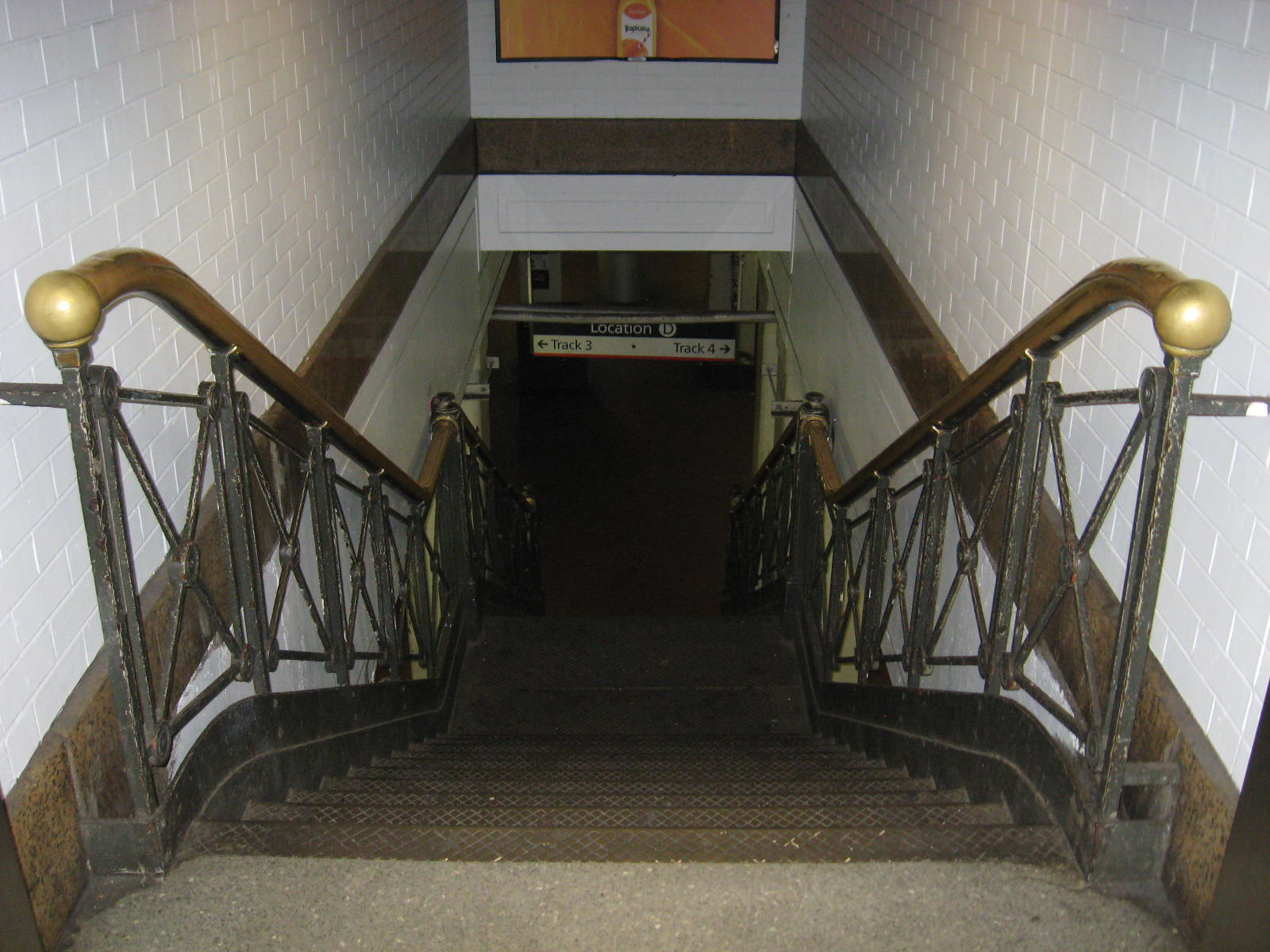
An original staircase between tracks 3 and 4

Other small architectural details remain in the station. Some of the original staircases to platform level, with brass and iron handrails, still exist, though others have been replaced with escalators. The original cast iron partition that separates the Long Island Rail Road waiting area on the lower concourse was uncovered during renovations in 1994. Original granite becomes exposed every so often in heavily trafficked corridors where modern flooring has worn, and the modern waiting areas and ticket booths occupy roughly the same spaces as the original 1910 configuration. Vestiges of the northern entrance carriageway also exist. The modern station still maintains the structural underpinnings of the original station. From platform level, glass vault lights can still be seen embedded within the ceiling (the floor of the lower concourse) that once let light pass through the concourse from the glass ceilings of the original train shed.

=== Penn Station Services Building ===
The Penn Station Services Building, located just south of the station at 242 West 31st Street between Seventh and Eighth avenues, was constructed in 1908 to provide electricity and heat for the station. The building measures 160 feet (49 m) long by 86 feet (26 m) tall, with a pink granite facade in the Roman Doric style, and was designed by McKim, Mead and White. A wall runs from north to south, bisecting the building, with power-generating boilers west of the wall and power distributing equipment and offices to the east.

The structure survived the demolition of the main station building, but was downgraded so that it only provided compressed air for the switches in the interlockings under the station. In January 2020, a southward expansion of Pennsylvania Station, to be called Penn South, was proposed. The proposal would expand the track area south to West 30th Street and require demolition of the entire block upon which the building is located.

== In media ==
The original Pennsylvania Station has been featured in several works of media. For instance, Rouben Mamoulian's 1929 film Applause depicted the station in a scene between the main character and her daughter. Several scenes in the 1945 film The Clock also take place in Pennsylvania Station, though they were shot on MGM Stage 27 due to World War II cost constraints. By contrast, the 1951 Alfred Hitchcock film Strangers on a Train, which has a chase scene in Pennsylvania Station, was filmed on site. The glass concourse is also shown in the opening and ending scenes of Stanley Kubrick's 1955 noir film Killer's Kiss.

After Pennsylvania Station was demolished, it was recreated for a scene in the 2019 film Motherless Brooklyn. Visual effects were combined with an actual set and actors in period costume, although the version shown reflects its more pristine image in the 1920s and 1930s rather than its more dilapidated condition by the film's 1957 setting.

== Gallery ==
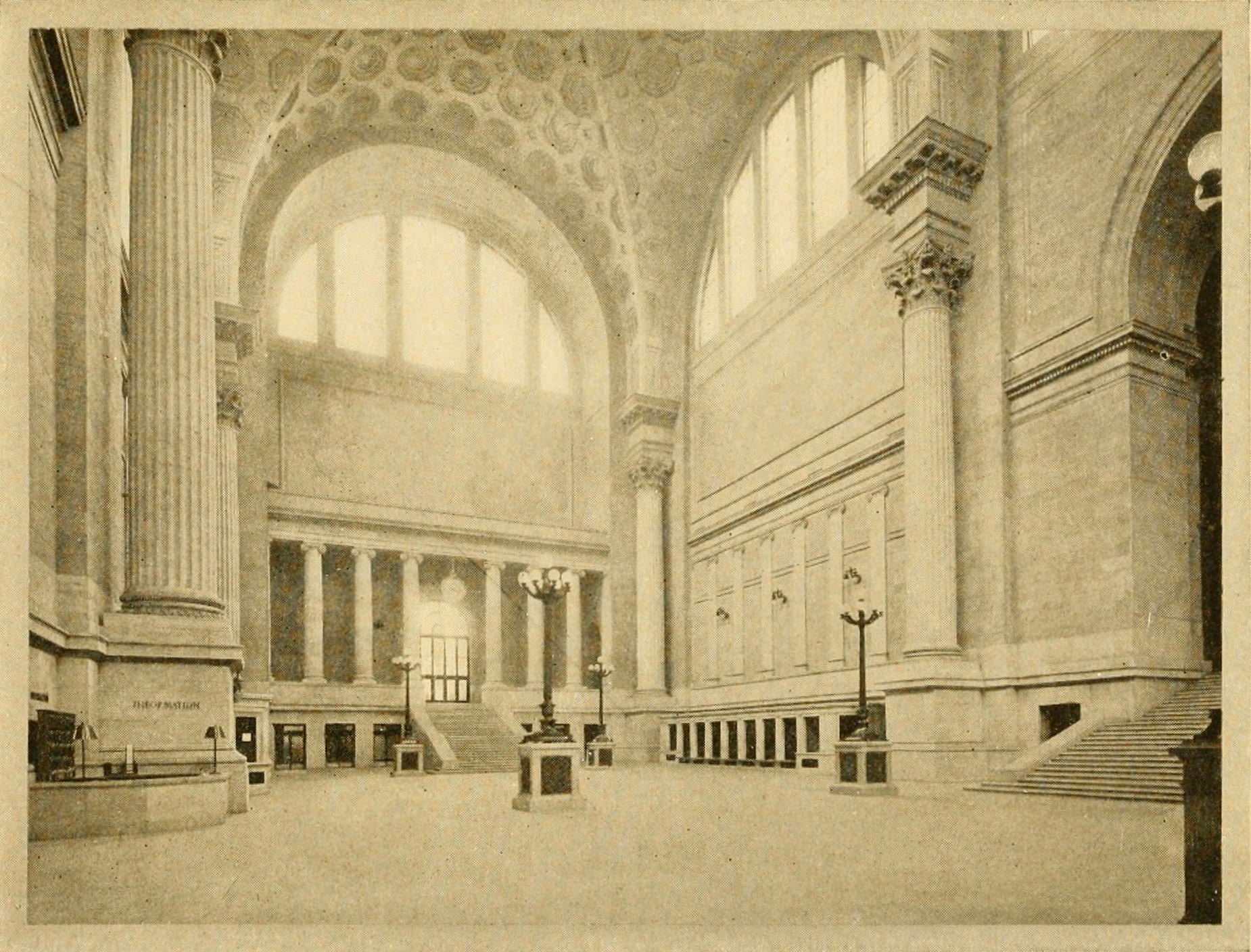
The main waiting room

The concourse

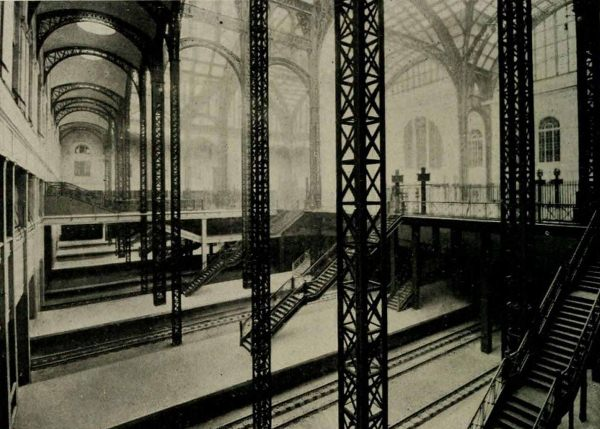
The concourse and steps down to the tracks

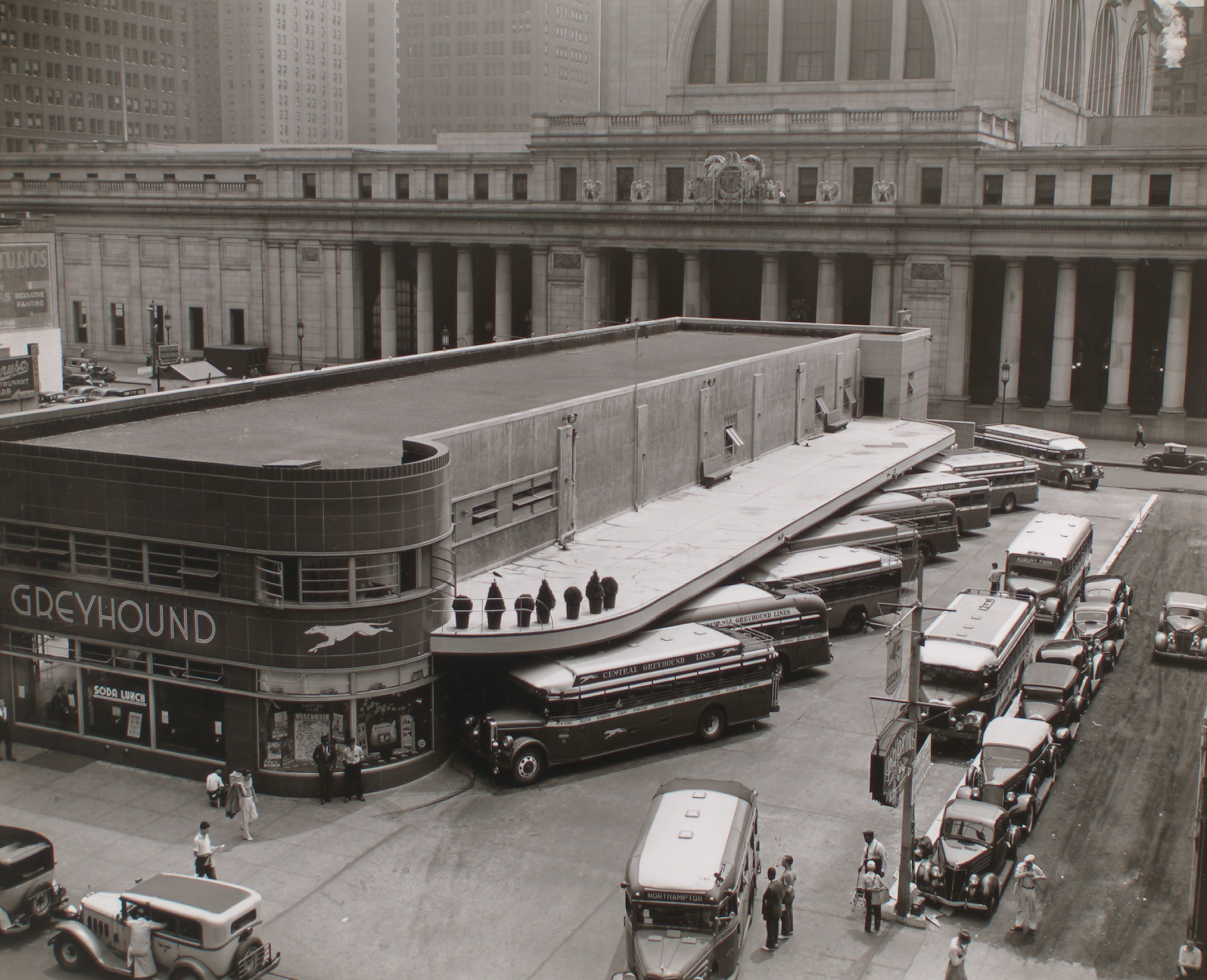
The former Greyhound Bus terminal beside the station
