= Auburn and Northern Electric Railroad =

Former railroad in New York

Overview
- Locale: New York, USA
- Dates of operation: 1904 (chartered); 1908–1931
- Predecessor: Auburn and Syracuse Electric Railroad
- Successor: Empire United Railways; Rochester and Syracuse Railroad

Chartered in 1904 by the Beebe Syndicate, the Auburn and Northern Electric Railroad connected the city of Auburn, New York with the Rochester, Syracuse and Eastern Railroad at Port Byron, New York to the north. The New York Board of Railroad Commissioners authorized construction and a $1 million mortgage to the A&N in 1905 so it could build 12 miles (19 km) of track between Auburn and Port Byron. Lease of the line to be used by A&N was negotiated at an Auburn and Syracuse Electric Railroad stockholders' meeting in May 1907.

Construction of the line was contested by the Lehigh Valley Railroad who initiated a frog war when the A&N tried to build a crossing at its tracks; the A&N obtained an injunction and continued building. The railroad began operation in 1908. Lehigh Valley Railroad kept the crossing as a point of contention with an order from the railroad commission in 1909 requiring the A&N to install and operate derails at the crossing.

In 1913, it was consolidated with the RS&E and the Syracuse, Lake Shore and Northern Railroad to form Empire United Railways.

A short-lived union, the new company encountered financial trouble in 1916 and the RS&E was reorganized as the Rochester and Syracuse Railroad. The A&N and the SLS&N were reorganized as the Empire State Railway in 1917 after Beebe Syndicate control came to an end. The A&N entered receivership in 1928. The R&S leased the former A&N starting in 1931 until the end of all service that June.
