= Court Street =

Court Street may refer to:

- Court Street (Boston), a street in Boston, Massachusetts
- Illinois Route 9, known as Court Street in Pekin, Illinois
- New York State Route 298, known as Court Street in Syracuse, New York
- Court Street School, a historic building in Freehold Borough, Monmouth County, New Jersey
- South Court Street, Montgomery, Alabama

== See also ==
- Court Street Bridge (disambiguation)
- Court Street Historic District (disambiguation)
- Court Street Station (disambiguation)
