= City Hall station (Rochester) =

Railway station in Rochester, New York, United States

City Hall
- City Hall station in 1945

General information
- Location: Rochester, New York; United States
- Coordinates: 43°09′16″N 77°36′45″W
- Owner: Rochester Industrial and Rapid Transit Railway
- Platforms: 1 island platform
- Tracks: 2 (former)

Construction
- Structure type: Underground

History
- Opened: December 1, 1927; 98 years ago
- Closed: June 30, 1956; 70 years ago

Services
Preceding station	Rochester Subway	Following station
Main & Oak toward General Motors	Main Line Service ended 1956	Court Street toward Rowlands
Location

City Hall was a former Rochester Industrial and Rapid Transit Railway station located in Rochester, New York. It was closed in 1956 along with the rest of the line.

== History ==
The station was in the former Erie Canal tunnel under West Broad Street in front of City Hall and the Times Square Building. Beside each building there were covered stairwells to provide access between street level and both ends of the platform. In 1928, the Rochester, Lockport and Buffalo Railroad and Rochester and Eastern Rapid Railway started to serve the station as the eastern terminus. The Rochester, Syracuse and Eastern Railroad used the station on its approach to Driving Park station.

The Broad Street Tunnel Project rehabilitated this section of the tunnel west of Exchange Boulevard in 2011 and paved the street. The subway tunnel between Main Street and Brown Street was filled in.
