= Clinton station (Rochester) =

Clinton

General information
- Coordinates: 43°8′57.57″N 77°36′15.17″W
- Owner: Rochester Industrial and Rapid Transit Railway
- Platforms: 1 island platform (proposed)
- Tracks: 2 (former)

History
- Opened: Never opened

Services
Preceding station	Rochester Subway	Following station
Court Street toward General Motors	Main Line Service ended 1956	Meigs-Goodman toward Rowlands
Location

Clinton was a proposed Rochester Industrial and Rapid Transit Railway station located in Rochester, New York. The station would have been located between Court Street and Meigs-Goodman stations, near the South Avenue Loop and the connection to the Lehigh Valley Railroad Station, close to the downtown central business district.

Plans for a wood and steel station were drawn up during the early 1940s and approved by City Council in June 1943, but turned down by the War Production Board. A revised design for a concrete structure costing $101,000 was then approved, but wartime shortages prevented its construction.
