= Lyell Avenue station =

Former rapid-transit station in Rochester, New York

Lyell Avenue

General information
- Location: Rochester, New York; United States
- Coordinates: 43°09′52″N 77°38′02″W
- Owner: Rochester Industrial and Rapid Transit Railway
- Platforms: 1 island platform
- Tracks: 2 (former)

History
- Opened: December 1, 1927; 98 years ago
- Closed: June 30, 1956; 70 years ago

Services
Preceding station	Rochester Subway	Following station
Edgerton Park toward General Motors	Main Line Service ended 1956	Main & Oak toward Rowlands
Location

Lyell Avenue was a former Rochester Industrial and Rapid Transit Railway station located in Rochester, New York. The Rochester, Lockport and Buffalo Railroad's ramp was located adjacent to the station; which closed in 1956 along with the rest of the line. An OTB currently sits on the site of the station.
