= Ashbourne station =

Ashbourne

General information
- Location: Brighton, New York
- Coordinates: 43°07′54″N 77°33′11″W
- Owner: Rochester Industrial and Rapid Transit Railway
- Platforms: 1 island platform
- Tracks: 2 (former)

History
- Opened: December 1, 1927; 98 years ago
- Closed: June 30, 1956; 70 years ago

Services
Preceding station	Rochester Subway	Following station
Highland toward General Motors	Main Line Service ended 1956	Elmwood toward Rowlands
Location

Ashbourne is a former Rochester Industrial and Rapid Transit Railway station located in Brighton, New York. It was closed in 1956 along with the rest of the line.

This station was built near Ashbourne Road in a cutting that had once been the bed of the Erie Canal and is now a section of the Interstate 590 highway.
