= Driving Park (disambiguation) =

Driving Park usually refers to places that currently are or formerly were site of harness or auto racing tracks.

Places named Driving Park:

- Worcester Driving Park, Worcester Agricultural Fairgrounds, Worcester Massachusetts
- Maple Avenue Driving Park, Dunn Field (Elmira), Elmira, New York
- Driving Park (Rochester, New York), Rochester, New York
- Elmira Driving Park, Elmira, New York
- Omaha Driving Park, North Omaha, Nebraska
- Driving Park, Columbus, Ohio
- Houston Driving Park (1902), Houston, Texas
- Charlottetown Driving Park, Charlottetown, Prince Edward Island, Canada
