= Monroe station (New York) =

Railway station in Rochester, the United States of America

Monroe Avenue

General information
- Location: Rochester, New York; United States
- Coordinates: 43°8′32″N 77°35′10″W
- Owner: Rochester Industrial and Rapid Transit Railway
- Platforms: 1 island platform
- Tracks: 2 (former)
- Connections: Monroe Ave line

History
- Opened: December 1, 1927; 98 years ago
- Closed: June 30, 1956; 70 years ago

Services
Preceding station	Rochester Subway	Following station
Meigs–Goodman toward General Motors	Main Line Service ended 1956	Culver toward Rowlands
Location

Monroe Avenue was a former Rochester Industrial and Rapid Transit Railway station located in Rochester, New York. It was closed in 1956 along with the rest of the line.

This station was built at Monroe Avenue in a cutting; formerly the bed of the Erie Canal which is now a section of the Eastern Expressway. Transfers were available to surface-level streetcars on Monroe Avenue.
