= Glenwood station (Rochester) =

Glenwood
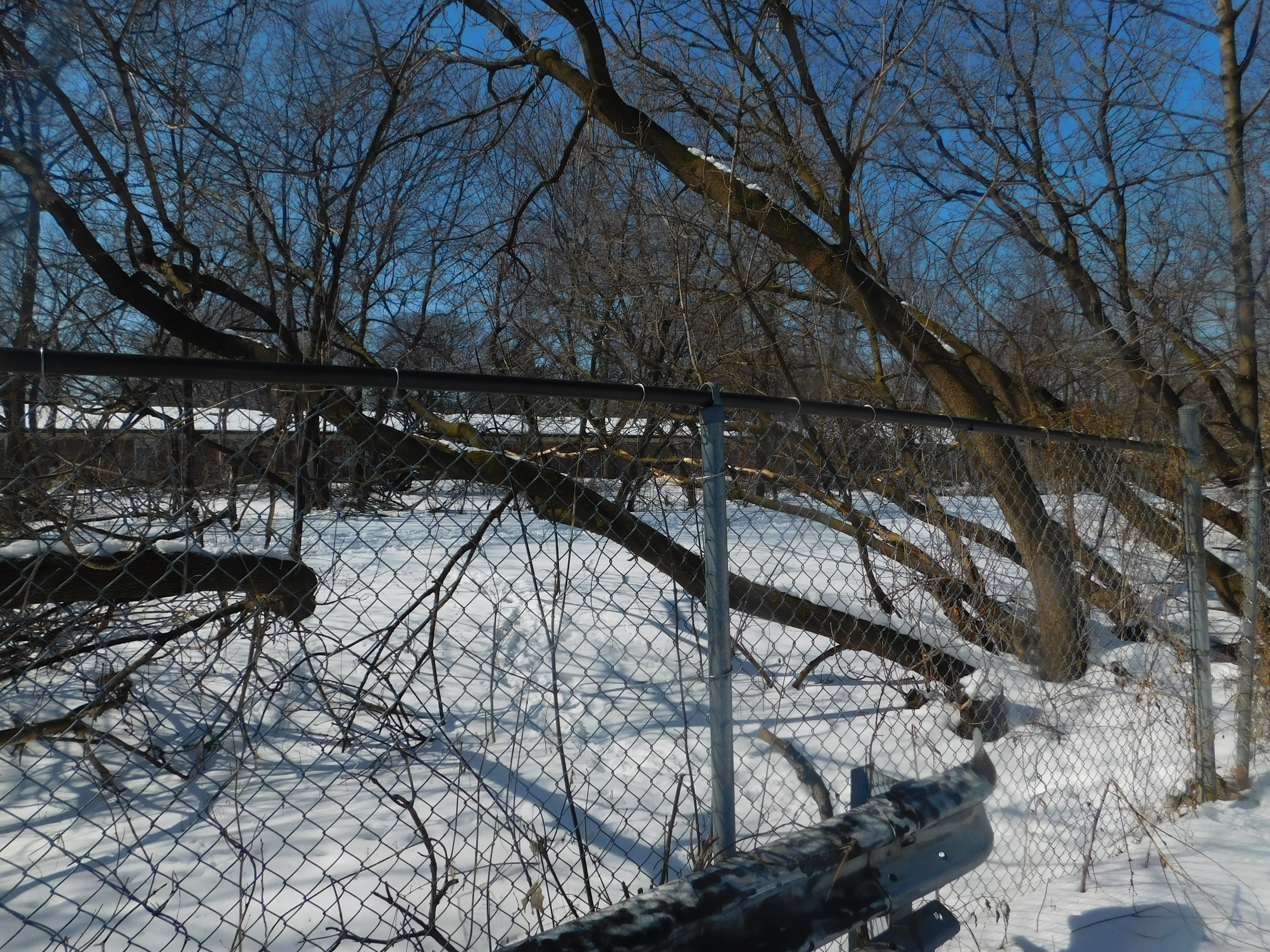
- The Glenwood station site in March 2019.

General information
- Location: Rochester, New York; United States
- Coordinates: 43°10′36″N 77°38′39″W
- Owner: Rochester Industrial and Rapid Transit Railway
- Platforms: 1 island platform
- Tracks: 2 (former)

History
- Opened: December 1, 1927; 98 years ago
- Closed: June 30, 1956; 70 years ago

Services
Preceding station	Rochester Subway	Following station
Lexington toward General Motors	Main Line Service ended 1956	Emerson toward Rowlands
Location

Glenwood is a former Rochester Industrial and Rapid Transit Railway station located in Rochester, New York. It was closed in 1956 along with the rest of the line.
