= Culver station =

Railway station in Rochester, New York, US

Culver

General information
- Location: Rochester, New York; United States
- Coordinates: 43°08′35″N 77°34′31″W
- Owner: Rochester Industrial and Rapid Transit Railway
- Platforms: 1 island platform
- Tracks: 2 (former)

History
- Opened: December 1, 1927; 98 years ago
- Closed: June 30, 1956; 70 years ago

Services
Preceding station	Rochester Subway	Following station
Monroe toward General Motors	Main Line Service ended 1956	Colby toward Rowlands
Location

Culver Avenue is a former Rochester Industrial and Rapid Transit Railway station located in Rochester, New York. It was closed in 1956 along with the rest of the line.

This station was built at Culver Road in a cutting that had once been the bed of the Erie Canal and is now a section of the Eastern Expressway, with a siding on the south side to the National Guard Armory

The Armory had originally been home to the 121st Cavalry Regiment, and in 2012 the building was repurposed into a mixed-use development Culver Road Armory, containing restaurants, offices, retail and residences.
