= Beebe Syndicate =

The Beebe Syndicate was the name given to a group of electric streetcar and interurban railroads as well as construction and finance companies that shared common management based in Syracuse, New York.

Founder Clifford D. Beebe (1866–1937) had returned to New York State after building up his career in the banking industry in Michigan. His first involvement with managing electric railways was presiding over the Syracuse and East Side Railway in 1894. After several years of involvement with various local streetcar lines, Beebe turned his attention to the development of electric interurban railways. Beginning in 1899, the Beebe Syndicate grew to control 28 individual companies at its height in 1915. By this time, many properties were placed in receivership due to overwhelming debt. Large parts of the Syndicate were sold into foreclosure in 1917, with the remaining lines reorganized independently. Beebe left the Syracuse area in 1919 and moved to New York City to pursue a career in real estate. He returned to Kalamazoo, Michigan, in 1935 and died of a sudden heart attack in 1937.

== Affiliated companies ==
- American Light, Power and Transportation Company
- Auburn and Northern Construction Company
- Auburn and Syracuse Construction Company
- Auburn and Syracuse Electric Railroad
- Buffalo, Lockport and Rochester Railway
- Edgecliff Park Company
- Electric Terminal Association
- Empire United Railways, Inc.
- Auburn and Northern Electric Railroad (EUS)
- Rochester, Syracuse and Eastern Railroad (EUS)
- Syracuse, Lake Shore and Northern Railroad (EUS)
- Hudson Finance Company
- Inter-State Financing and Construction Company
- Interurban Publishing Company
- Monroe County Electric Belt Line
- Newark and Marion Railway
- Newark, Williamson and Northern Railroad
- Oneida Lake Terminal Company
- Onondaga Amusement Company
- Ontario Construction Company
- Rochester Belt Line
- Sagamore Navigation Company
- Skaneateles Lake Transportation Company
- Syracuse Railroad Construction Company
- Syracuse and South Bay Electric Railroad
- Syracuse Terminal Association
- Syracuse, Watertown and St. Lawrence River Railroad
- Warren Street Realty Company
