= Main & Oak station =

Main & Oak

General information
- Other names: West Main Street
- Location: Rochester, New York; United States
- Coordinates: 43°09′16″N 77°37′13″W
- Owner: Rochester Industrial and Rapid Transit Railway
- Platforms: 1 island platform
- Tracks: 2 (former)
- Connections: Main Street lines

Construction
- Structure type: Underground

History
- Opened: December 1, 1927; 98 years ago
- Closed: June 30, 1956; 70 years ago

Services
| Preceding station | Rochester Subway | Following station |
|---|---|---|
| Lyell Avenue toward General Motors | Main Line Service ended 1956 | City Hall toward Rowlands |
Location

Main & Oak, also known as West Main Street, was a former Rochester Industrial and Rapid Transit Railway station located in Rochester, New York. Streetcars on Main Street could be accessed via a surface connection. The station closed in 1956 along with the rest of the line.

The Broad Street Tunnel Project rehabilitated some sections and the subway tunnel where this station had been located, between Main Street and Brown Street, was filled in. The new west portal to the tunnel is just west of this station along Broad Street.
