= Highland station (New York) =

Former Rochester Industrial Rapid Transit Railway station in Rochester, New York

Highland

General information
- Location: Rochester, New York; United States
- Coordinates: 43°08′13″N 77°33′10″W
- Owner: Rochester Industrial and Rapid Transit Railway
- Platforms: 1 island platform
- Tracks: 2 (former)

History
- Opened: December 1, 1927; 98 years ago
- Closed: June 30, 1956; 70 years ago

Services
Preceding station	Rochester Subway	Following station
Halfway toward General Motors	Main Line Service ended 1956	Ashbourne toward Rowlands
Location

Highland is a former Rochester Industrial and Rapid Transit Railway station located in Rochester, New York. It was closed in 1956 along with the rest of the line.

This station was built at Highland Avenue in a cutting that had once been the bed of the Erie Canal and is now a section of the Interstate 590 highway.
