= East Avenue =

East Avenue may refer to a street in many cities:

- East Avenue (Quezon City), Philippines
- East Avenue (Rochester, New York), and related East Avenue Historic District
  - East Avenue station, Rochester,

== See also ==
- East Street (disambiguation)
- E Street (disambiguation)
