= Lexington station (Rochester) =

Railway station in Rochester, New York, US

Lexington

General information
- Location: Rochester, New York; United States
- Coordinates: 43°10′44″N 77°38′50″W
- Owner: Rochester Industrial and Rapid Transit Railway
- Platforms: 1 island platform
- Tracks: 2 (former)

History
- Opened: December 1, 1927; 98 years ago
- Closed: June 30, 1956; 70 years ago

Services
Preceding station	Rochester Subway	Following station
Driving Park toward General Motors	Main Line Service ended 1956	Glenwood toward Rowlands
Location

Lexington is a former Rochester Industrial and Rapid Transit Railway station located in Rochester, New York. It was closed in 1956 along with the rest of the line.
