= Edgerton Park station =

Edgerton Park
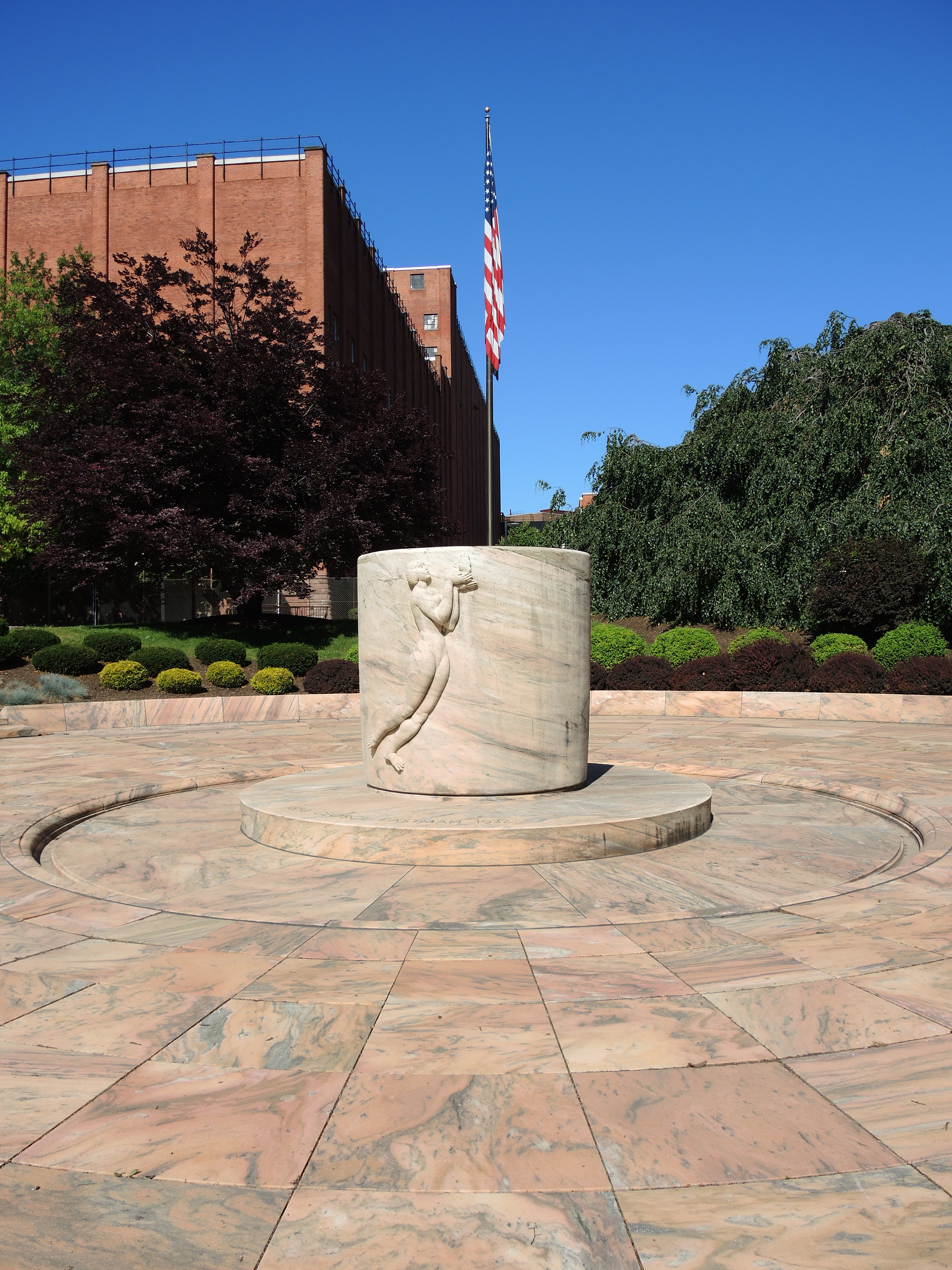
- Station had access to the Eastman Business Park.

General information
- Location: Rochester, New York; United States
- Coordinates: 43°10′11″N 77°38′15″W
- Owner: Rochester Industrial and Rapid Transit Railway
- Platforms: 1 island platform
- Tracks: 2 (former)

History
- Opened: December 1, 1927; 98 years ago
- Closed: June 30, 1956; 70 years ago
- Former names: Felix Street

Services
Preceding station	Rochester Subway	Following station
Emerson toward General Motors	Main Line Service ended 1956	Lyell Avenue toward Rowlands
Kodak Park Terminus	Dewey Avenue Branch Service ended 1956	Terminus
Location

Edgerton Park was a former Rochester Industrial and Rapid Transit Railway station located in Rochester, New York. It was named after Edgerton Park, about 300 feet (90 m) away, where the Monroe County Fair was held each September. Until summer 1938 the station had been named Felix Street. Other destinations at the station included Edgerton Park Arena. The station was closed in 1956, along with the arena and the rest of the line and coinciding with the fair's relocation to new facilities in suburban Henrietta.

Immediately north of the station, there was City of Rochester siding which serviced facilities that still exist in the area. Farther north, towards Emerson station, there was a surface freight spur line running north along Dewey Avenue to Kodak Park.
