= East Avenue station =

East Avenue

General information
- Location: Rochester, New York; United States
- Coordinates: 43°08′38″N 77°33′07″W
- Owner: Rochester Industrial and Rapid Transit Railway
- Platforms: 1 side platform
- Tracks: 2 (former)

History
- Opened: December 1, 1927; 98 years ago
- Closed: June 30, 1956; 70 years ago

Services
Preceding station	Rochester Subway	Following station
Winton toward General Motors	Main Line Service ended 1956	Halfway toward Rowlands
Location

East Avenue was a former westbound Rochester Industrial and Rapid Transit Railway station located in Rochester, New York. The Rochester and Syracuse Railroad ramp was located near the station. It closed in 1956 along with the rest of the line.
