= Sunset station =

Sunset station or Sunset Station may refer to:

== Transportation ==
- 17th Street/SMC station, a light rail station in Los Angeles County, California, formerly named "Sunset"
- Judah and Sunset station, a streetcar stop in San Francisco, California
- San Antonio station (Texas), a railway station that was also known as the "Sunset Station"
- Sunset station (New York), a former rapid transit station in Rochester, New York
- Sunset Transit Center, an intermodal station in Washington County, Oregon
- Taraval and Sunset station, a streetcar stop in San Francisco, California
- Vermont/Sunset station, a subway station in Los Angeles, California

== Other uses ==
- Sunset Station (hotel and casino), in Henderson, Nevada, USA
- Sunset 102, a radio station in Manchester, England, UK

== See also ==
- Sunset (disambiguation)
