= United Railways =

United Railways may refer to:

- United Railways (Oregon)
- United Railways of St. Louis, Missouri
- United Railways and Electric Company, Maryland
- Michigan United Railways
- Empire United Railways, New York
