= Syracuse, Lakeside and Baldwinsville Railway =

Railway in New York

Overview
- Locale: Syracuse, New York to Baldwinsville, New York
- Dates of operation: 1898–1905
- Successor: Syracuse, Lake Shore and Northern Railroad

Technical
- Track gauge: 4 ft 8 1/2 in (1,435 mm) standard gauge

The Syracuse, Lakeside and Baldwinsville Railway began operations in 1898 and provided service along the shore of Onondaga Lake outside of Syracuse, New York. Due to dependence on summer traffic, the company did not prosper during the remainder of the first year; however, during 1899, the rail was extended to Baldwinsville, a suburb, and the line began to handle daily commuter traffic.
