= Rochester Junction station =

Lehigh Valley Railroad station in Mendon, New York

Rochester Junction
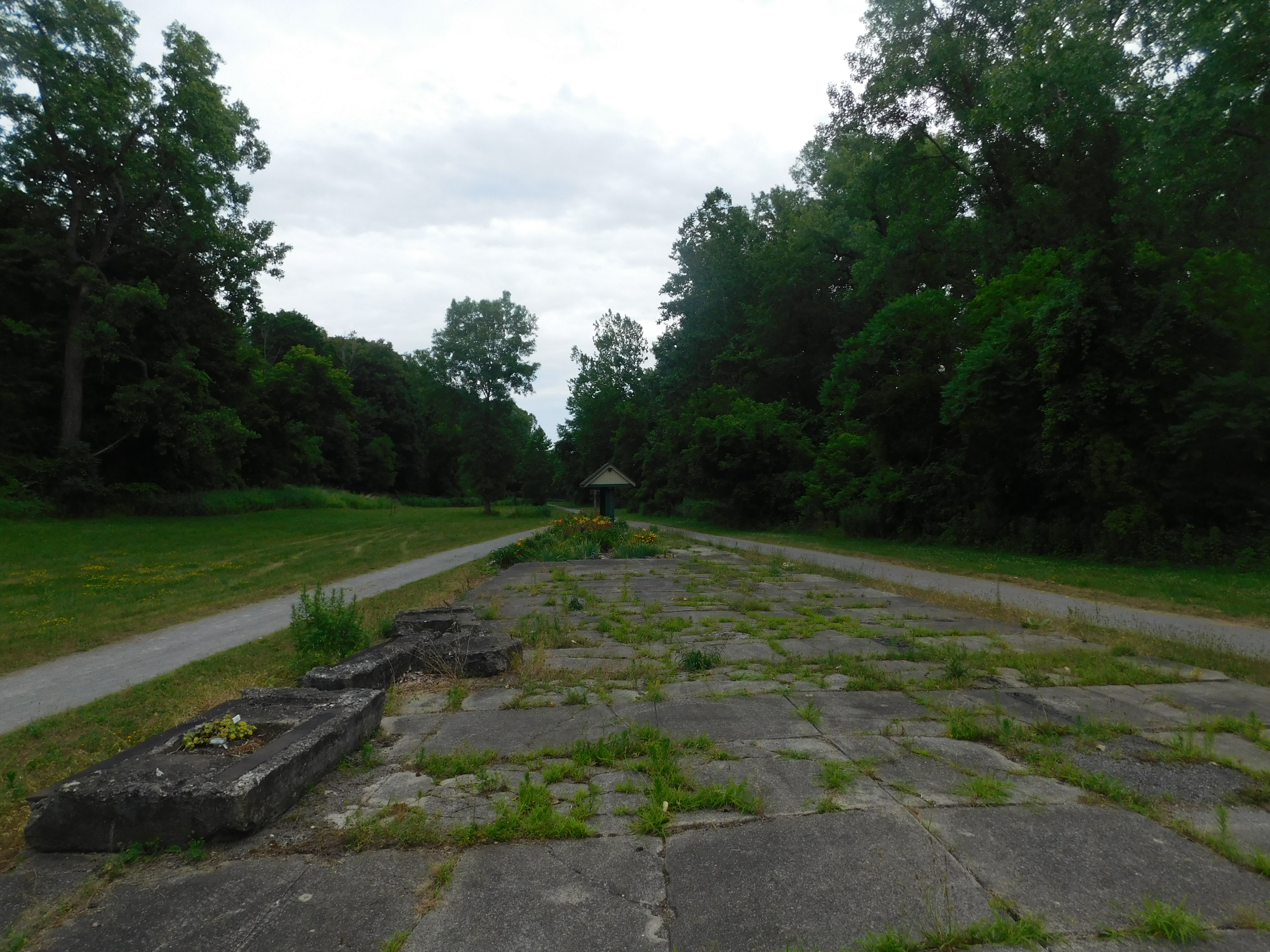
- Station platform in July 2024, facing east

General information
- Lines: Lehigh Valley main line; Rochester Branch

History
- Opened: 1892
- Closed: May 12, 1959

Former lines
Preceding station	Lehigh Valley Railroad	Following station
Batavia toward Buffalo	Main Line	Jim Thorpe toward New York or Jersey City
Rush toward Buffalo	Main Line	Mendon toward New York or Jersey City
Honeoye Falls toward Hemlock	Rochester Branch	Cedar Swamp toward Rochester

Rochester Junction station was a Lehigh Valley Railroad station in Mendon, New York. The station was at the junction of the Lehigh Valley's main line and its Rochester Branch, which provided access to Rochester, 13.2 miles (21.2 km) to the north, and Hemlock, 15.1 mi to the south.

The station opened in 1892. This original building remained in use for four years until it was replaced by a larger structure. The Lehigh Valley disassembled the first station and moved it to Lima, New York.

Buses replaced trains over the Rochester Branch on September 6, 1950. Rochester Junction was one of many stations which lost its passenger service on May 12, 1959, when the Lehigh Valley eliminated 60% of its remaining passenger trains, including all but one round-trip west of Lehighton, Pennsylvania. The Lehigh Valley continued to use the building for storage until a fire destroyed it on April 22, 1973. A local Boy Scout troop constructed a replica of the freight house on the former station site in 2013.
