= Rochester and Syracuse Railroad (interurban) =

Shortline railway in the United States (1917–1931)

Overview
- Locale: Syracuse, New York, to Rochester, New York
- Dates of operation: 1917–1931

Technical
- Track gauge: 4 ft 8 1/2 in (1,435 mm) standard gauge

The Rochester and Syracuse Railroad was a double-track, high-speed line 87 miles (140 km) long that ran between Rochester and Syracuse, New York. The tracks paralleled the New York Central Railroad and the Erie Canal and had only one grade crossing with another railroad its entire length.

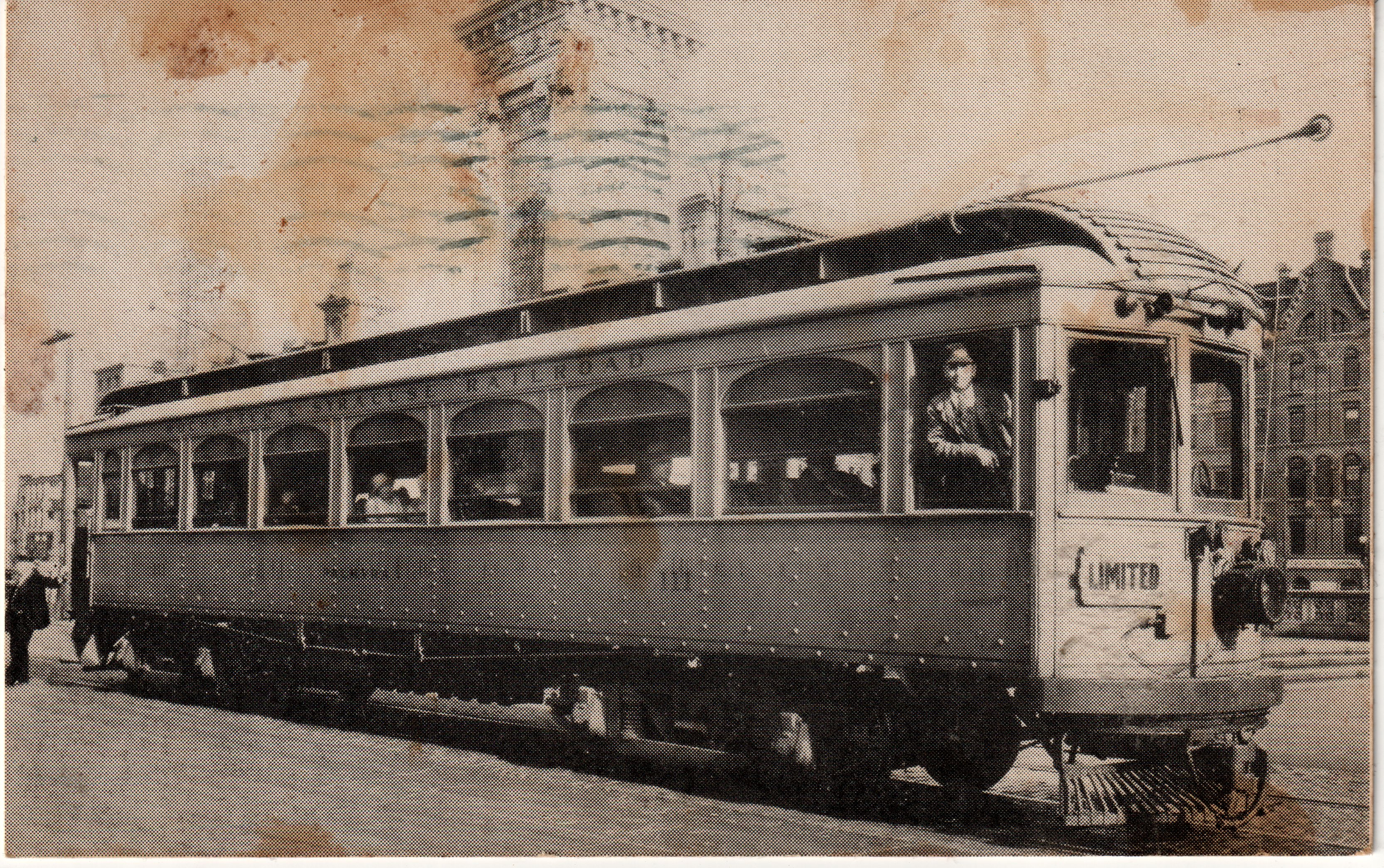
Rochester Syracuse and Eastern 111 built 1906 by Niles Co. Rebuilt by Rochester & Syracuse RR In 1922 with steel sides, into chair car in 1927. Leaving Clinton Sq in downtown Syracuse

The road was first established as the Rochester, Syracuse and Eastern Railroad in 1909, although a number of miles had been in use since 1906. In 1930, the rail was sold for junk and the line was abandoned in 1931.

== History ==
The Rochester and Syracuse Railway, Inc., of Syracuse, New York, was incorporated as the successor to the Rochester, Syracuse and Eastern Railroad which was built in 1909 at a cost of $7 million, an exceptionally large sum.

Clifford D. Beebe owned the rail and it was part of the Beebe Syndicate that ran from Rochester, to Syracuse, to Auburn and on to Oswego on the shores of Lake Ontario.

=== Company management ===
Arthur W. Loasby was president, T. C. Cherry was vice-president and general manager, and Elbert A. Hervey was treasurer.

=== Empire United Railways ===
In 1913, largely in an effort to deal with heavy fixed charges of the Rochester, Syracuse and Eastern Railroad, Beebe merged the line with two of his other interurban rails into Empire United Railways. The effort not successful and the new company failed in 1915 and was dissolved into its component interurbans in 1916. Beebe withdrew from interurban operation and the Rochester, Syracuse and Eastern Railroad was reorganized in 1917 as the Rochester and Syracuse Railroad.

=== Financial ===
The property was sold under foreclosure on August 28, 1917. When the new company formed in 1917, the firm had $3,000,000 of preferred stock and $1,500,000 of common stock outstanding.

=== Operations ===
While the road was in operation, it was noted for a high standard of service. Beginning in 1913, the company had three parlor cars on its limited trains. This continued until World War I, when they were converted for freight service.

In 1927, the rail rebuilt seven of its standard coaches for limited service with double-width windows, bucket seats and new flooring. The limiteds made the trip in two hours and 40 minutes, some 50 minutes faster than local trains. After 1928, cars used the Rochester Subway for their entrance to the city, saving about 12 minutes in running time.

In spite of its "excellent physical plant," the interurban was unable to convince the railroads to interchange freight cars.

=== Vacation excursions ===
By May 1923, a ten-day round trip to Rochester from Syracuse cost $3.90. The company advertised that a day would be spent in Sea Breeze, the largest resort west of Coney Island or the Highland, Seneca or Durand-Eastman Parks; "The finest free municipal parks in the State."

Tickets were sold at the "Electric Terminal" at 112 West Genesee Street where other rails such as Syracuse Northern Electric Railroad and Empire State Railway also sold vacation excursions.

=== Receivership ===
The company went into receivership in 1930 and was sold for junk in the following year. The line was abandoned shortly after midnight on June 28, 1931.
