= Elmwood station =

Elmwood station may refer to:

- Elmwood station (Connecticut), a bus rapid transit station in West Hartford, Connecticut
- Elmwood station (New York), a former rapid transit station in Rochester, New York
- Elmwood Park station, a commuter rail station in Elmwood Park, Illinois
