= Meigs–Goodman station =

Former railway station in Rochester NY USA

Meigs–Goodman

General information
- Location: Rochester, New York; United States
- Coordinates: 43°08′32″N 77°35′46″W
- Owner: Rochester Industrial and Rapid Transit Railway
- Platforms: 1 island platform
- Tracks: 2 (former)

History
- Opened: December 1, 1927; 98 years ago
- Closed: June 30, 1956; 70 years ago

Services
Preceding station	Rochester Subway	Following station
Court Street toward General Motors	Main Line Service ended 1956	Monroe toward Rowlands
Location

Meigs–Goodman is a former Rochester Industrial and Rapid Transit Railway station located in Rochester, New York. It was closed in 1956 along with the rest of the line.

This station was built between Meigs Street and Goodman Street South in a cutting that had once been the bed of the Erie Canal and is now a section of the Eastern Expressway.
