= Elmwood station (New York) =

Elmwood

General information
- Location: Brighton, New York
- Coordinates: 43°07′36″N 77°33′12″W
- Owner: Rochester Industrial and Rapid Transit Railway
- Platforms: 1 island platform
- Tracks: 2 (former)

History
- Opened: December 1, 1927; 98 years ago
- Closed: June 30, 1956; 70 years ago

Services
Preceding station	Rochester Subway	Following station
Ashbourne toward General Motors	Main Line Service ended 1956	Sunset toward Rowlands
Location

Elmwood is a former Rochester Industrial and Rapid Transit Railway station located in Brighton, New York. It was closed in 1956 along with the rest of the line.

This station was built at Elmwood Avenue in a cutting that had once been the bed of the Erie Canal and is now a section of the Interstate 590 highway.
