= Rochester, Lockport and Buffalo Railroad =

Railway in New York

Overview
- Headquarters: Syracuse, New York; Rochester, New York
- Reporting mark: RLB
- Locale: Western New York
- Dates of operation: 1919–1931
- Predecessor: Buffalo, Lockport & Rochester Railway

Technical
- Track gauge: 4 ft 8 1/2 in (1,435 mm) standard gauge
- Electrification: 600 V DC
- Length: 54 mi (87 km)

The Rochester, Lockport and Buffalo Railroad was an electric interurban railway that was constructed between Rochester, New York, and Lockport, New York, connecting to the International Railway Co. at Lockport for service into Buffalo. Opened in 1909 as the Buffalo, Lockport and Rochester Railway, the route followed the Erie Canal and the New York Central Railroad's Falls Road branch for most of its length. The direct route took a little over two hours to travel from Lockport from Rochester. Most trains were local routes and took 2 hours 35 minutes. There were trains between the main stations every hour, however there were trains between Rochester and Brockport every 30 minutes and sometimes every 15 minutes. For a brief period of time, the railway was part of the Beebe Syndicate of affiliated interurban railways stretching from Syracuse to Buffalo. Entering receivership in 1917, it was reorganized as the Rochester, Lockport and Buffalo Railroad in 1919. After years of struggling with declining revenue during the Depression years, the railway's last day of service was April 30, 1931.

== Early history (1902–1911) ==
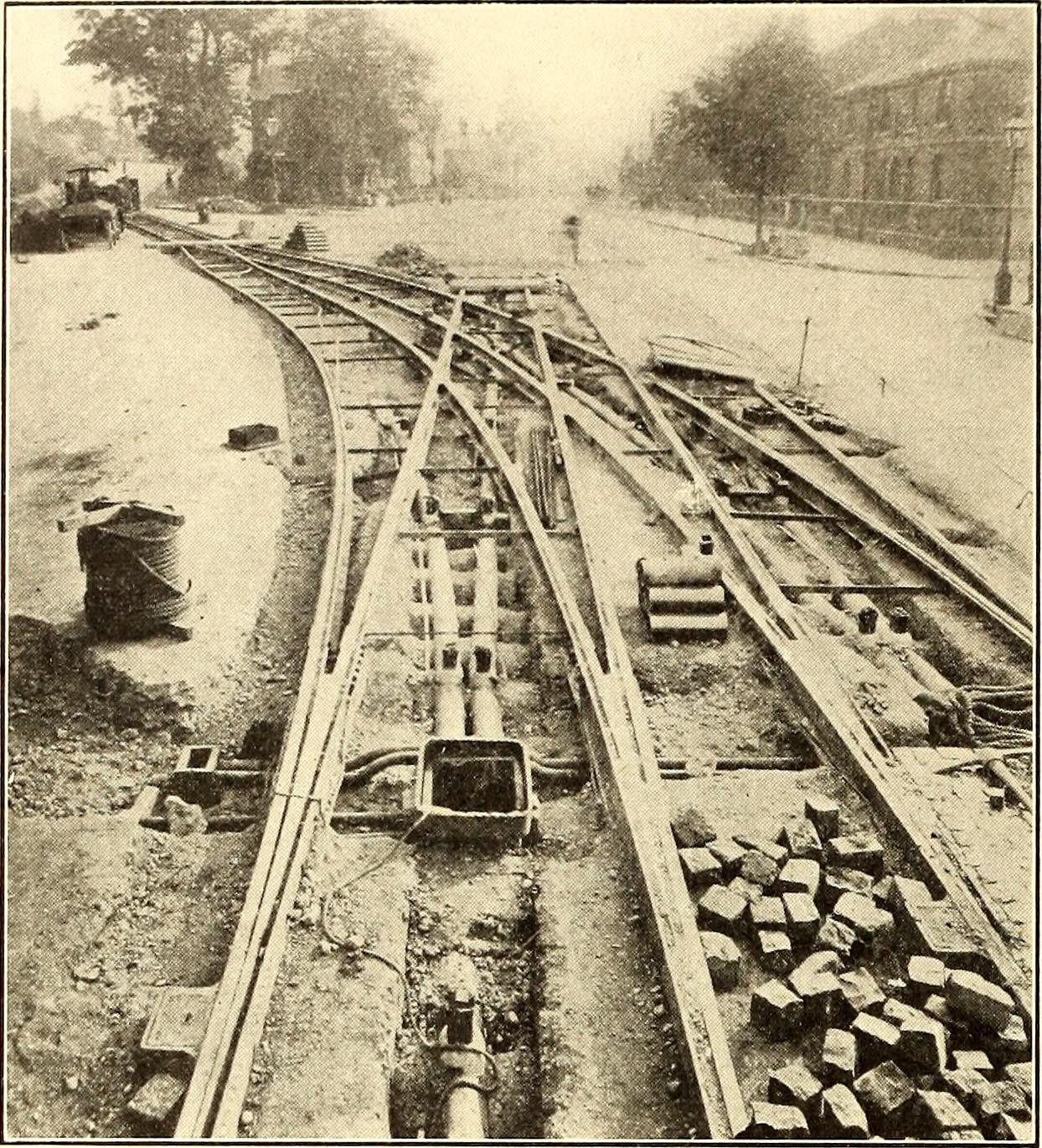
Railway construction (1906)

There were several early attempts to build an electric interurban railway connecting Rochester and Buffalo, starting in 1902 with the Buffalo, Niagara Falls & Rochester. None of these attempts resulted in any significant construction, except for the Albion Electric Railway which constructed 1.7 miles (2.7 km) of track through the village of Albion.

On June 23, 1905, the Buffalo, Lockport and Rochester Railway was chartered as a result of the combination of the Albion and Lockport Railway, the Albion and Rochester Railway, and the Albion Electric Railway. The new owners of the company were predominantly Canadian, and it was rumored that a connection to Toronto would soon be considered. The BL&R ran for 54 miles (87 km) from a connection with the International Railway Co. in Lockport to a connection with the Rochester Railways at Lyell Avenue. The route closely followed the Erie Canal and New York Central's Falls Road for most of its length.

The first section of the BL&R opened on September 3, 1908, from Rochester to a point just west of Albion, and by November 17 had reached Lockport. The new railway could not reach downtown Rochester because it was unable to secure permission to install a diamond to cross the New York Central Railroad's Charlotte Branch at Lyell Avenue. The New York State Public Service Commission intervened and permission was granted to construct the crossing in May 1910. The BL&R served the Interurban Terminal at the corner of Court and Exchange streets until 1914 when the terminal was moved to the nearby Erie Railroad station. A connection could be made to the Rochester, Syracuse and Eastern interurban line. Thousands of passengers were attracted to the BL&R's swift local service and cheaper fares that competed directly with the nearby "steam roads" serving the same areas.

== Operation by the Beebe Syndicate (1911–1917) ==
Almost immediately, the BL&R had defaulted on its mortgage bonds and was placed in receivership in 1909. In 1911, Clifford D. Beebe (1866–1937) purchased the BL&R and placed it under the common management of his other associated interurban lines, known collectively as the "Beebe Syndicate." That summer, service was extended to Olcott Beach over the tracks of International Railway Co. connecting to a leased steamship providing ferry service to Toronto. This service came to an end after the close of the 1914 sailing season.

In 1914, arrangements were made for the operation of BL&R cars from Lockport directly into downtown Buffalo over International Railway Co. tracks. This arrangement came to an end in 1919. Freight was also operated over the line, with much of the traffic coming from the rich farming areas along the line needing to haul goods to market or to various canning facilities.

By 1915, the Beebe Syndicate controlled 28 different trolley and interurban lines stretching from Syracuse to Buffalo. Dreadfully overcapitalized, the organization was placed in receivership and Beebe himself retired from the active management of his assembled empire.

== Rochester, Lockport & Buffalo (1919–1931) ==
All ties had been severed with the Beebe Syndicate towards the end of 1917, and the BL&R was facing financial trouble once again. The railroad emerged from reorganization in the spring of 1919 as the Rochester, Lockport and Buffalo Railroad. Freight business continued to grow, which helped bolster the railroad's bottom line.

Passenger operation into downtown Rochester changed on February 4, 1928, when the RL&B ran its first train into the newly opened Rochester Subway. Constructed in the bed of the old Erie Canal, the Subway was designed to help funnel interurban traffic and speed local passengers through the city. A ramp from the surface lines at Lyell Avenue descended into the Subway and terminated at City Hall station. Trains would then run empty to the South Avenue Loop just beyond Court Street station. The Rochester & Eastern and the Rochester & Syracuse both offered connections at City Hall station for continued eastward travel. In 1928, as traffic was beginning to decline, each car of the trains was painted a different color (white, red, blue) to draw attention to the trains.

The majority of the new owners were businessmen from Rochester, which helped keep the operation close to local interests. Passenger and freight levels dropped through the 1920s as connecting lines were closed and the railroad met increasing competition from improved highways and the proliferation of affordable automobiles. Unable to continue operating at a significant loss with no hope of reorganization, the last trains ran on the RL&B on April 30, 1931.

== List of stations ==
Listing obtained from BL&R public timetable dated March 3, 1909. Sidings and other local stops not shown.

- Lockport
- Gasport
- Middleport
- Medina
- Knowlesville
- Albion
- Hulberton
- Holley
- Brockport
- Adams Basin
- Spencerport
- Rochester

== Legacy ==
There are not many traces of the RL&B left in the 21st century, as the right of way has been reclaimed across the many communities the railroad served. Nearly all of the railroad's equipment was scrapped or sold off for non-railroad use. The body of car 206 was located at Knowlesville for many years and acquired by the Rochester and Genesee Valley Railroad Museum in 1998. In 2010, the car was transferred to the nearby New York Museum of Transportation and stored until the car can be evaluated for future restoration.

In 1995, a former unmanned RL&B station (believed to have come from Adam's Basin) building was purchased at auction and brought to the R&GVRRM for preservation. This station was placed along the museum railroad in 2009, and is currently used by visitors who are making the transfer from trolley to diesel train.

In Spencerport the former station that serviced the line was moved and converted to a residence. In 2006 the building was acquired by the Village of Spencerport, moved to a site alongside the southern bank of the Erie Canal close to where the station once stood during service. It has been restored and converted into the Spencerport Depot & Canal Museum, which serves as a museum, welcome center, library, and boater restroom facility.

A steel Pratt through truss bridge is still in place over the Erie Canal near Lee Road in Rochester. The bridge has not carried a train since the end of RL&B service in 1931.
