= East Street (disambiguation) =

East Street is a busy street market in Walworth in South London.

East Street may also refer to:

- East Street (Bridport) railway station, a disused railway station in Dorset
- East Street (CDOT station), a proposed bus station in Connecticut
- "East Street" (Children in Need), a crossover episode between Coronation Street and EastEnders, broadcast as part of Children in Need 2010
- East Street, Fremantle, Western Australia

== See also ==
- E Street (disambiguation)
- East Avenue (disambiguation)
