= Clinton Depot =

Clinton Depot may refer to:

- Clinton Depot (Minnesota), a historic railway station in Clinton, Minnesota
- Clinton Depot (North Carolina), a historic railway station in Clinton, Sampson County, North Carolina
- Clinton station (disambiguation)
