= Dinosaur Bar-B-Que =

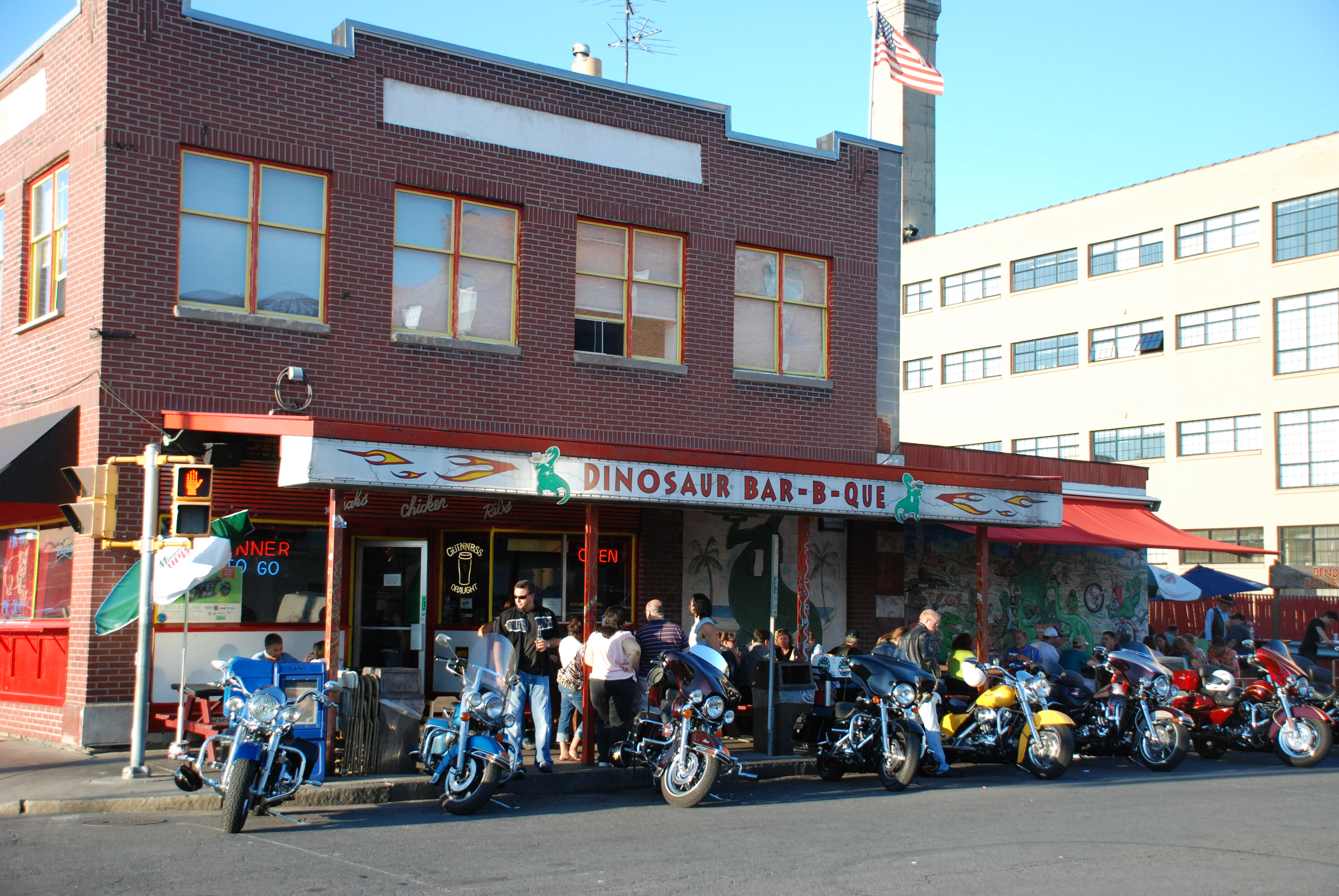
- Dinosaur Bar-B-Que's Syracuse Location
- Interactive map of Dinosaur Bar-B-Que

Restaurant information
- Established: 1988; 38 years ago
- Food type: Barbecue
- Location: 246 West Willow Street, Syracuse, Onondaga County, New York, 13202, United States
- Other locations: Harlem, Brooklyn, Rochester, Troy, Buffalo
- Other information: Former locations in Newark, New Jersey, Stamford, Connecticut, Chicago and Baltimore
- Website: DinosaurBarBQue.com

Dinosaur Bar-B-Que is a restaurant, blues venue, and biker bar chain located mostly in upstate New York with branches in New York City, and formerly in New Jersey, Illinois, Connecticut and Maryland.

== History ==
First opened in 1988 on Willow Street in downtown Syracuse, the restaurant subsequently opened locations in older buildings of historical significance in several cities. The Syracuse location used to be N&H tavern and once housed a Cadillac dealership. The Rochester restaurant is a former Lehigh Valley Railroad station overlooking the Genesee River. The Buffalo restaurant is a former Universal Pictures film storage vault. The Brooklyn restaurant had been a tool & die shop, and the former Newark location was once a boxing club where Rubin Carter trained, Stamford was a Yale Lock Co. factory.

A cookbook with many of the restaurant's recipes was published titled Dinosaur Bar-B-Que: An American Roadhouse in 2001. Many of the restaurant's signature sauces are also bottled by Private Label Foods and sold in grocery stores and online.

In late November 2006, the Syracuse location was affected by the Norovirus and was closed for about a week until cleared to reopen by county health inspectors. Hundreds of customers and employees were affected. It is unclear how the virus materialized. Onondaga County health inspectors found no fault on the restaurant's part.

In May 2009, Dinosaur Bar-B-Que was voted America's best barbecue in ABC's Good Morning America poll. Approximately 4000 out of the 7500 participants in the poll chose Dinosaur Bar-B-Que.

Adam Richman, host of the Travel Channel's Man v. Food, took the show to Syracuse (season 3, episode 13) on June 8, 2010. Dinosaur Bar-B-Que was the first stop for Richman, who tried the restaurant's "Pork-Sket" sandwich (which features 1/2 pound each of brisket and pulled pork). It was first broadcast on the Travel Channel on September 1, 2010.

In March 2015, a New York City law firm filed a class action lawsuit against Dinosaur Bar-B-Que, claiming the chain systematically underpaid its tipped workers. The firm, Fitapelli & Schaffer, has filed similar lawsuits for workers at T.G.I. Friday's and Chipotle.

In May 2022, at the Buffalo Location, Freddie Gibbs was involved in an altercation where he and 15 other men, including Benny the Butcher fought. This incident stemmed from past rap beef between the two.

Dinosaur BBQ was always a staple at the New York State Fair. However, they were not present at the 2024 New York State Fair.

== Restaurants ==
Dinosaur Bar-B-Que has 5 restaurants currently in operation along with 6 restaurants that have closed down.

In April 2026, the company announced the closure of its Gowanus, Brooklyn location, after 15 years of operation. In a social media post, the company cited they have reached the end of their lease on the building, and the building was being demolished to make way for a new apartment building.

=== Current restaurants ===
| Restaurant Number | Restaurant Name | Location | Opened | Seats | Square feet | Notes |
|---|---|---|---|---|---|---|
| 1 | Syracuse, NY | 246 W Willow St, Syracuse, NY 13202 | 1988 | ? | ? | Original restaurant. Formally an N&H tavern and once housed a Cadillac dealership |
| 2 | Rochester, NY | 99 Court St, Rochester, NY 14604 | 1998 | ? | ? | First restaurant in Rochester, New York. Formally a Lehigh Valley Railroad station. |
| 3 | Harlem, NY | 700 W 125th St, New York, NY 10027 | 2004 | ? | 7,000 | First restaurant in New York City. |
| 4 | Troy, NY | 377 River St, Troy, NY 12180 | 2010 | 250 | 9,200 | First restaurant in the Capital District. Formally Fresno's restaurant. |
| 5 | Hamburg, NY | 4245 McKinley Parkway, Hamburg, NY 14075 | 2025 | ? | ? | Replaces the downtown Buffalo location. Located near Highmark Stadium. |

=== Former restaurants ===
| Restaurant Number | Restaurant Name | Location | Opened | Closed | Duration Of Time Operated | Seats | Square feet | Notes |
|---|---|---|---|---|---|---|---|---|
| 6 | Newark, NJ | 224 Market St, Newark, NJ 07102 | May, 2011 | August, 2021 | 10.24 years | 180 | 6,000 | First restaurant in New Jersey. Formerly a boxing club where Rubin Carter trained. |
| 7 | Stamford, CT | 845 Canal St, Stamford, CT 06902 | December, 2012 | June, 2020 | 7.5 years | ? | 7,500 | First restaurant in Connecticut. Closed due to the effects of COVID-19. Formerly a Yale Lock Co. factory |
| 8 | Chicago, IL | 923 W Weed St, Chicago, IL 60642 | April, 2015 | July, 2016 | 1.25 years | 168 | 12,686 | First restaurant in Illinois and the Midwest. Two story restaurant. |
| 9 | Baltimore, MD | 1401 Fleet St, Baltimore, MD 21231 | September, 2015 | January, 2018 | 2.39 years | ? | ? | First restaurant in Maryland. Building opened in 1885. |
| 10 | Brooklyn, NY | 604 Union St, Brooklyn, NY 11215 | 2013 | Spring, 2026 | 15 years | 65 | ? | Formally a motor freight company and the Perfect Steel Rule Die Corp. |
| 11 | Buffalo, NY | 301 Franklin St, Buffalo, NY 14202 | 2014 | February, 2025 | 11 years | 180 | 6,000 | First restaurant in Buffalo, New York. Formally a Universal International Pictures movie vault. |

== Gallery ==
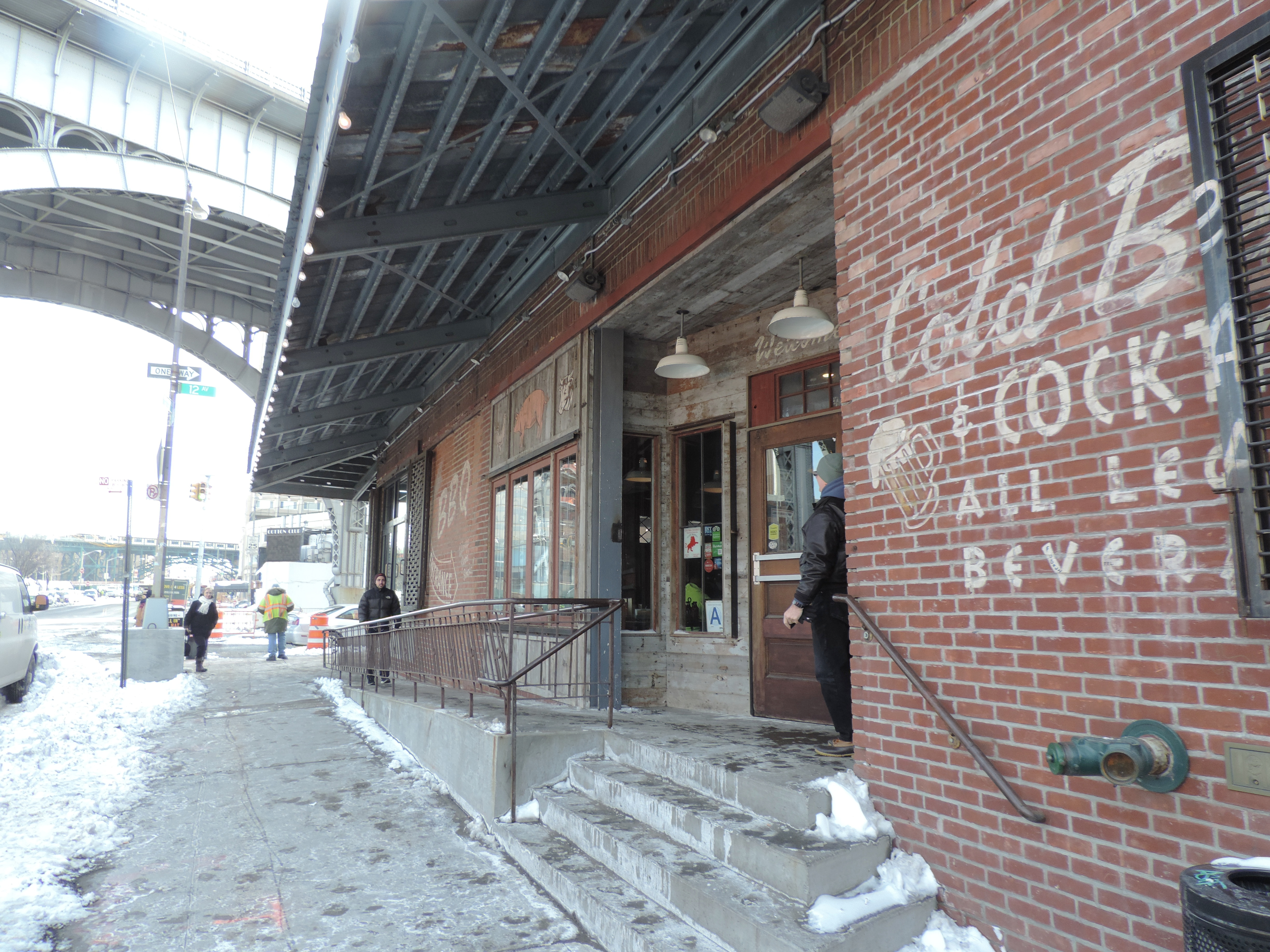
West Harlem restaurant

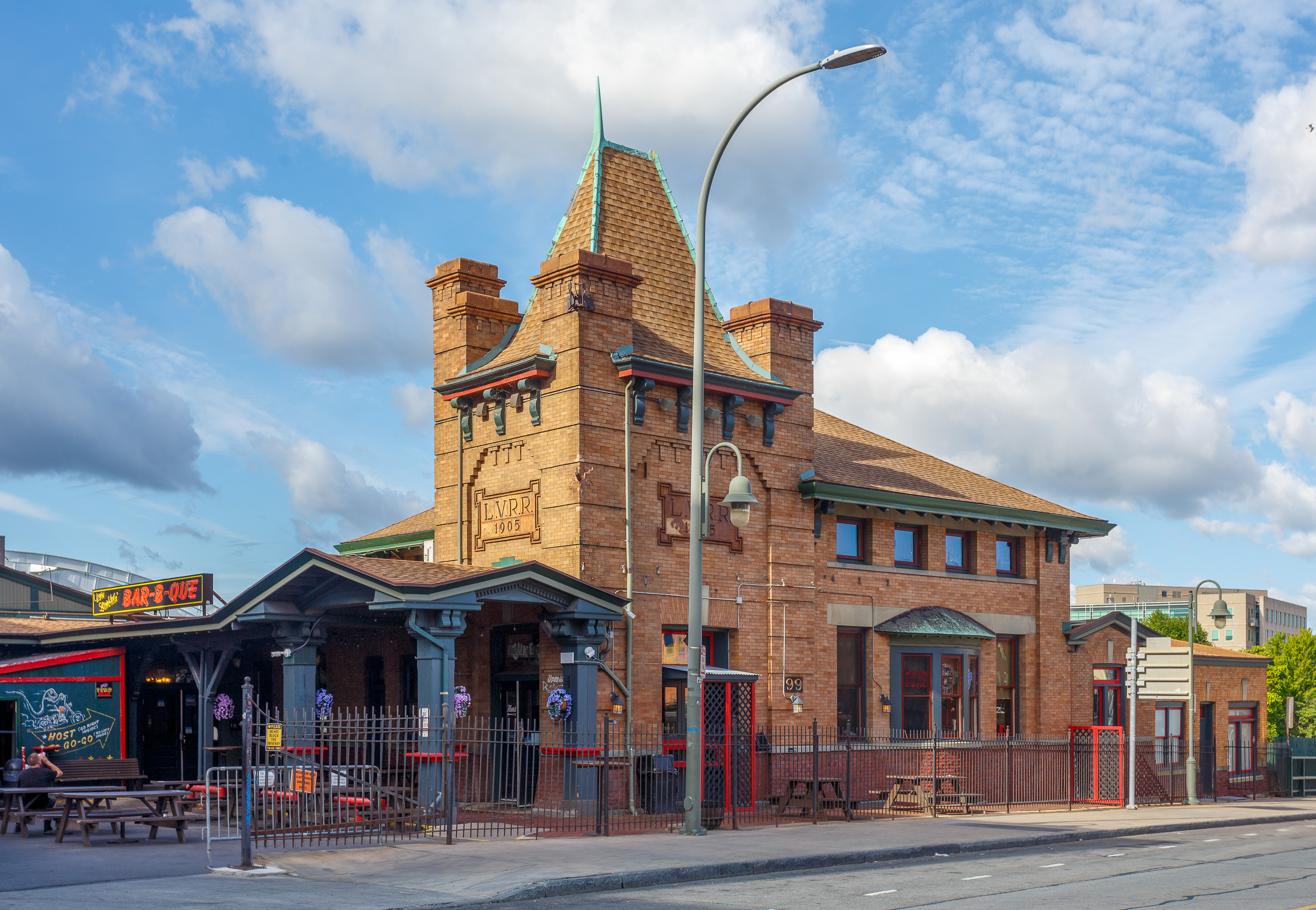
Rochester, New York location in the former Lehigh Valley Railroad Station

== See also ==
- List of barbecue restaurants
