= Clinton station =

Clinton station may refer to:

- Clinton Depot (Minnesota), a historic railway station in Clinton, Minnesota
- Clinton station (Montana), a railway station in Clinton, Montana
- Clinton Depot (North Carolina), a historic railway station in Clinton, North Carolina
- Clinton station (Connecticut), a commuter rail station in Clinton, Connecticut
- Clinton station (Iowa), a railway station in Clinton, Iowa
- Clinton station (Indiana), a railway station in Clinton, Indiana
- Clinton station (CTA Blue Line), a subway station in Chicago, Illinois
- Clinton station (CTA Green and Pink Lines), an ‘L’ station in Chicago, Illinois (also called Clinton/Lake)
- Clinton station (Rochester), a proposed rapid transit station in Rochester, New York
- Clinton Road station, a former commuter rail station in Garden City, New York
- Clinton Street Station (Trenton), a passenger train station in Trenton, New Jersey
- Clinton Street/Southeast 12th Avenue station, a light rail station in Portland, Oregon
- Clinton–Washington Avenues (IND Crosstown Line), a New York City Subway station in Manhattan; serving the G train
- Clinton–Washington Avenues (IND Fulton Street Line), a New York City Subway station in Manhattan; serving the A and C train

== See also ==
- Clinton Power Station, a power generating station near Clinton, Illinois
- Clinton-Sherman Air Force Base, originally Naval Air Station Clinton
