= Court Street Historic District =

Court Street Historic District may refer to:

- Court Street Historic District (West Point, Mississippi), listed on the NRHP in Mississippi
- Court Street Historic District (Binghamton, New York), listed on the NRHP in New York
- Court Street Historic District (Plattsburgh, New York), listed on the NRHP in New York
