= Elmira Driving Park =

Former horse racing course in Elmira, New York

Coordinates: 42°7′5″N 76°48′48″W

- Interactive map of Elmira Driving Park
- Location: Elmira, New York, U.S.
- Owned by: Elmira Driving Park Association
- Date opened: 1875
- Course type: Harness racing

Elmira Driving Park was an American harness racing track located in Elmira, New York.

== History ==
Incorporated in April 1871, the Elmira Driving Park Association was chartered with ten directors: Frank H. Atkinson, Samuel T. Reynolds, Ephraim W. Howes, Lorenzo Howes, Charles J. Langdon, Myron H. Foster, Charles W. Skinner, Henry H. Purdy, Uri Bartholomew, and Frederick A. Frasier. The organization elected Atkinson as president, Reynolds as vice president, Foster as treasurer, Howes as superintendent, and William E. Straight as secretary. Although plans began early, the association did not convene its first formal meeting until the fall of 1875. That June, additional incorporators presented themselves before Notary Francis G. Hall, among them Nathaniel R. Seeley, John A. Reynolds, Jefferson B. Clark, Alexander S. Diven, J. M. Shoemaker (Walkie), Alvin R. Burgett, Crans T. Potter, J. R. Reid, and Edwin Eldridge.

The Elmira Driving Park, completed in August 1875, stood in the city of Elmira, New York. A half-mile track was built a little east of Eldridge Park. Considerable funds were spent by the directors to make the Elmira Driving Park grounds usable, as it had long been marshy and waterlogged. In areas where the track had been artificially built up, the judges and reporters inside the stand could feel the structure shake whenever a group of horses sped by at top speed. Grandstands and refreshment booths were built just east of Grand Central Avenue.

On September 23, 1875, the Daily Advertiser highlighted Elmira's new driving park, noting its spacious half-mile track, superior to the Rochester Driving Park's, along with quality stables, a hotel, and a grandstand. Established by wealthy local sportsmen, it opened during the New York State Fair with streetcars running regularly from downtown. An estimated 20,000 visitors arrived on September 30, 1875, and 51 horses from across the U.S. were slated to compete, with the grand opening well publicized.

At the Elmira Driving Park on October 2, 1875, American Girl died after collapsing in the first heat of the $2,000 free-for-all. American Girl had shown strong form at the start of the second State Fair race, with John L. Doty driving. She had led after several scores, but Doty noticed something wrong at the first turn and released the reins. She staggered for about an eighth of a mile before falling and dying at the quarter-pole. The Elmira Driving Park Association commissioned a bronze statue of American Girl, which stood at the entrance to the grounds.

== Closure ==
About five years after opening, the Elmira Driving Park at Eldridge Park hosted its last official race in 1880.

The Delaware, Lackawanna and Western Railroad cut through Eldridge Park in 1883 with a rail line that split the property between the racetrack on the east and the Park View Hotel on the west. When the newly built line passed through Elmira, the Elmira Driving Park stopped hosting races. The railway took a portion of the association's property, prompting extensive alterations to ready the park for racing again. These improvements were carried out throughout 1884 by new management. All the buildings were thoroughly repaired and made first-rate, while the track was restored to prime condition, ranking among the best half-mile tracks in the state. With capable and proactive leaders overseeing the park, all was in place for premier races to return on July 2, 3, and 4, 1884. It marked the first races on the track in three years.

When the Elmira Driving Park Association dissolved in 1885, the property in Elmira Heights had belonged to the heirs of J. W. Hathorn and Nathaniel Seeley.

The grandstand at Elmira Driving Park, constructed in 1874, was destroyed by fire in April 1887. The fire caused $6,000 in damage, of which $4,000 was insured.

In 1907, the heirs filed for its partition, appointing John F. Murtaugh to oversee the process. The abandoned grounds of the old driving park were frequently occupied by squatters and itinerant groups.
