= Syracuse and East Side Street Railway =

Overview
- Headquarters: Syracuse, New York
- Locale: Syracuse, New York
- Dates of operation: 1896–1899

Technical
- Track gauge: 4 ft 8 1/2 in (1,435 mm) standard gauge

The Syracuse and East Side Street Railway, an interurban rail in Syracuse, New York, was chartered on August 25, 1894, and was a successor to the Syracuse, Eastwood Heights and DeWitt Railroad Company. The company was also known as the Syracuse and East Side Railroad.

The company went bankrupt and was placed in receivership on May 11, 1898, and on December 29, 1898, the property was purchased by the bondholders. The East Side Traction Company was chartered on January 14, 1899 after a reorganization.
