= Rochester Branch =

History
- Opened: September 1892

Technical
- Line length: 29 mi (47 km)
- Track gauge: 1,435 mm (4 ft 8 1/2 in) standard gauge

The Rochester Branch is a partially-abandoned railway line in Upstate New York. At its fullest extent, it ran 29 miles (47 km) from Rochester to Hemlock, on the northern shore of Hemlock Lake. The line was built by subsidiaries of the Lehigh Valley Railroad between 1892 and 1895. The line has been abandoned except for a short section in the vicinity of Henrietta owned by the Livonia, Avon and Lakeville Railroad.

== History ==
The Lehigh Valley Railroad's main line had been completed to Buffalo in 1892. The line missed Rochester, passing some 14 miles (23 km) to the south. The Rochester and Honeoye Valley Railroad, incorporated in 1888, was already developing a line south from Rochester that would intersect the Lehigh Valley's line. The Lehigh Valley took control of this company in 1891. The line opened between Rochester and Honeoye Falls, 16 miles (26 km), in September 1892. The line connected with the Lehigh Valley Railroad main line at Rochester Junction, and also crossed the West Shore Railroad main line.

The Lehigh Valley consolidated the Rochester and Honeoye Valley Railroad with the Rochester and Southern Railroad (not to be confused with the modern company of the same name) in 1895 to create the Rochester Southern Railroad. That company completed an extension south from Honeoye Falls to the north shore of Hemlock Lake in 1895. The extension was 13.6 miles (21.9 km) long, and there was also a .5-mile (0.80 km) branch to Hemlock proper. The southern 3,100 feet (940 m) to Hemlock Lake was abandoned in 1902 after Rochester began using the lake as a reservoir.

Passenger service south of Honeoye Falls ended in 1935, and between Honeoye Falls and Rochester Junction in 1937. The last passenger trains on the branch, running between Rochester Junction and Rochester, ended on September 7, 1950. The line between Lima and Hemlock was abandoned in 1968. After the freight house in Rochester burned down in 1971, the Lehigh Valley abandoned the northern end of the line and used the parallel Erie-Lackawanna Railroad's route to enter Rochester.

With the Lehigh Valley Railroad's bankruptcy in the 1970s the remainder of the Rochester Branch, running 17.3 miles (27.8 km) from River Junction to Lima, was conveyed to Conrail. (Note: The Final System Plan incorrectly includes an additional .4 miles (0.64 km) within Rochester, at mileposts 392.0–392.4.) Conrail embargoed the line in August 1981 and announced plans to abandon it. Approximately 3 miles (4.8 km) were retained between the former West Shore Railroad main line and Henrietta; Conrail sold this remnant to the Livonia, Avon and Lakeville Railroad in 1996.
