= Court Street Station =

Court Street Station may refer to:

- Court Street station (Boston), a former Blue Line station
- Court Street station (Rochester), a former rapid transit station in New York state
- Court Street (IND Fulton Street Line station), a former subway station in Brooklyn, now the site of the New York Transit Museum
- Court Street – Borough Hall (New York City Subway), a subway station in Brooklyn, New York
- Court Street – Myrtle Avenue (New York City Subway), a former subway station in Brooklyn, New York on the demolished Fulton Street Elevated
