= Newark and Marion Railway =

Overview
- Locale: Wayne County, New York
- Dates of operation: 1900–1930
- Successor: Marion Railway Corporation (1917); Pennsylvania Railroad (1930)

Technical
- Track gauge: 4 ft 8 1/2 in (1,435 mm)
- Length: 8.19 mi (13.18 km)

The Newark and Marion Railway operated between Newark, New York, and Marion, New York. Chartered in 1900, it opened for business in 1906. The railroad was constructed by the Beebe Syndicate, a conglomeration of streetcar and interurban lines across New York State, though the Newark and Marion was never electrified. The company entered receivership in 1915, and control by the Beebe Syndicate ended. The railroad was reorganized as the Marion Railway Corporation in 1917. The Pennsylvania Railroad acquired the line in 1930. It continued to operate as a spur of the Elmira Branch through the Penn Central and Conrail eras. Operation passed to short line Ontario Midland Railroad in 1979. Dwindling freight traffic and deteriorating track conditions led to the line's closure in July 1984.

== Unbuilt Extensions ==
The Newark, Williamson and Northern Railroad was formed by the Beebe Syndicate in 1914 to construct a new railroad from Newark to Williamson through Marion. The Newark and Marion was to be acquired and integrated into this new project. Contractors from the Syracuse Railroad Construction Company surveyed portions of the line in 1915. When the Newark and Marion went into receivership in 1915 and was no longer controlled by the Beebe Syndicate, plans for extensions were called off.

== See also ==
- Elmira and Lake Ontario Railroad
- Northern Central Railway
