= Court Street Bridge =

Court Street Bridge may refer to:

- Court Street Bridge (Binghamton)
- Court Street Bridge (Genesee River)
- Court Street Bridge (Hackensack River)
