= Sunset station (New York) =

Historical railway station

Sunset

General information
- Location: Brighton, New York
- Coordinates: 43°07′20″N 77°33′13″W
- Owner: Rochester Industrial and Rapid Transit Railway
- Platforms: 1 island platform
- Tracks: 2 (former)

History
- Opened: December 1, 1927; 98 years ago
- Closed: June 30, 1956; 70 years ago

Services
Preceding station	Rochester Subway	Following station
Elmwood toward General Motors	Main Line Service ended 1956	Rowlands Terminus
Location

Sunset is a former Rochester Industrial and Rapid Transit Railway station located in Brighton, New York. It was closed in 1956 along with the rest of the line.

This station was built at Sunset Drive in a cutting that had once been the bed of the Erie Canal and is now a section of the Interstate 590 highway.
