= Driving Park station =

Transit station in Rochester, New York, USA

Driving Park

General information
- Location: Rochester, New York; United States
- Coordinates: 43°10′51″N 77°39′04″W
- Owner: Rochester Industrial and Rapid Transit Railway
- Platforms: 1 island platform
- Tracks: 2 (former)

History
- Opened: December 1, 1927; 98 years ago
- Closed: June 30, 1956; 70 years ago

Services
Preceding station	Rochester Subway	Following station
General Motors Terminus	Main Line Service ended 1956	Lexington toward Rowlands
Location

Driving Park is a former Rochester Industrial and Rapid Transit Railway station located in Rochester, New York. It was the terminus of the line from its opening in 1927 until the extension to General Motors in 1937. It was closed in 1956 along with the rest of the line.

== See also ==
- Driving Park (Rochester, New York)
