= Eldridge Park =

Amusement park in Elmira, New York

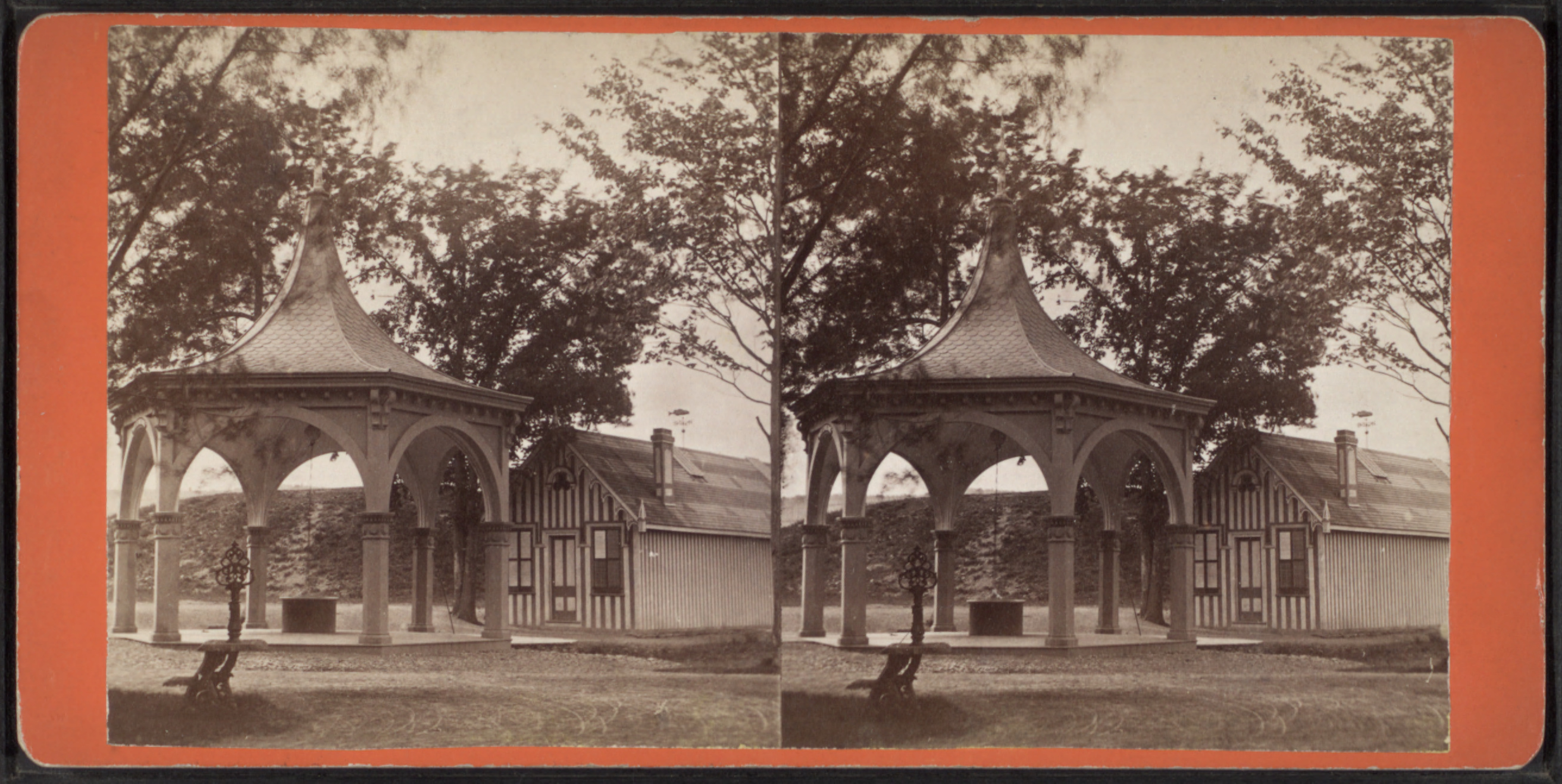
- Stereo card of a gazebo at the park
- Interactive map of Eldridge Park
- Location: Elmira, New York, U.S.
- Coordinates: 42.115113°N 76.816817°W
- Status: Operating
- Opened: July 4, 1926
- Owner: City of Elmira
- Operating season: May–September
- Area: 15 acres (6.1 ha)

Attractions
- Total: 6
- Website: www.eldridgepark.org

Eldridge Park is an amusement park located in Elmira, New York, which opened around the turn of the 20th century. Covering roughly 15 acres (6.1 ha), it is dedicated to the memory of a local physician and is still operating.

The park includes an 1890s Looff Carousel, an outdoor stage, an extensive network of picnic areas, a wooden roller coaster, a haunted house, a shooting gallery, bumper cars, a boat ride along the park's lake, eateries, a miniature golf course, and a small-gauge train ride through the park, in addition to several other rides and attractions.

In local folklore, Eldridge Lake was believed to be bottomless, and that an underwater tunnel connected it to Seneca Lake, 20 miles (32 km) to the north, one of the Finger Lakes in Upstate New York. However, the depth of the lake is 39 feet (12 m) and there are no known tunnels that connect Eldridge Lake with Seneca Lake.

Eldridge Park also has several soccer fields, used by the local travel soccer club, Soaring Capital Soccer Club, as well as a skate park, a baseball field, and a historic Erie boxcar.

== History ==
A pharmacist, Dr. Edwin Eldridge, purchased the land where the park is today and built a sculpture garden. The city of Elmira later bought the land in 1889, after Eldridge died.

== Attractions ==
=== Looff Carousel ===
One of the most iconic features of the park is the restored 1890s Looff Carousel which was originally built in the late 1890s and operated by Young’s Million Dollar Pier in Atlantic City, New Jersey. The carousel, measuring 50 feet (15 m) in diameter with three rows of stationary animals, was purchased by Robert A. Long and moved to Eldridge Park in 1924. Long altered the carousel somewhat, re-carved some animals, and converted the stationary animals to jumping figures. Long's family operated the carousel until 1988, by which time the ride had deteriorated badly and the hand-carved wooden animals were sold at auction in 1989. The carousel mechanism was not sold, and instead was donated to the City of Elmira.

In the early 2000s, the Carousel Preservation Society was formed with the goal of acquiring hand-carved animals and restoring the carousel. On May 26, 2006, the restored Eldridge Park Carousel was re-opened to the public.

The current version of the Eldridge Park carousel boasts 56 hand-carved animals and two dragon benches. It is thought to be the fastest carousel in the United States, moving at 11.5 miles per hour (18.5 km/h), and is one of the few remaining carousels in the United States to have brass ring feeders.

=== Other park amenities ===
Between 2003 and 2006, many amenities were added, including entrances, a gift shop, a stage, restrooms, park benches, and fountains. In 2007, the former whip building was converted into a dance hall. In 2008 Jasper II, a boat ride around the lake, was introduced, along with a new old-fashioned arcade.

Dragon paddle boats were introduced on Memorial Day weekend in 2009. A concessions building was also added.

In 2010, a new Mark Twain-themed miniature golf course opened. The course has a traditional eighteen holes, as well as scenery including fountains, ponds, stones, flowers, and a waterfall. A miniature train ride was also built to circle around the course. In 2012, the Thunderbird Flying Scooters returned to the park. While they no longer fly over Eldridge Lake, they remain an extremely popular ride.

The opening of the park for the 2013 season saw a complete redesign of the Eldridge Midway. Instead of potholed blacktop, cement pavers, gardening, and Victorian-style lights were debuted. Along with a brand-new midway, the park saw the return of the children's Pony Cart ride and the opening of several different food vendors.

For the 2016 season, the park announced the addition of two attractions, a boat ride and a statue that pays tribute to the racehorse American Girl that died at Elmira Driving Park in 1875. The park also announced an opening ceremony for the special opening of a record two attractions. The ceremony took place on May 27.
