= Syracuse, Eastwood Heights and DeWitt Railroad =

Overview
- Headquarters: Syracuse, New York
- Locale: Syracuse, New York to DeWitt, New York and Messina Springs, New York
- Dates of operation: 1859–1894

Technical
- Track gauge: 4 ft 8 1/2 in (1,435 mm) standard gauge

The Syracuse, Eastwood Heights and DeWitt Railroad, an interurban rail in Syracuse, New York was established in 1859. This was one of the most important of the first lines and operated as a steam road. The company was awarded the operation rights for the Burnet Avenue route as well as the Burnet Street Car Company.

In 1889, the company had reorganized and eventually owned 10 miles (16 km) of road that ran from Burnet Avenue through Eastwood to Messina Springs and DeWitt. The company went bankrupt in 1894.
