= Messina Springs, New York =

Coordinates: 43°4′11″N 76°5′26″W

Messina Springs was a hamlet in DeWitt, New York, northeast of Syracuse, at the intersection of James Street and Thompson Road. In the 19th century the hamlet became known for the mineral springs that it grew around (and was named after). It held a series of hotels, and a horse racing track. Messina Springs declined following the turn of the century: the hotel burnt down and was not rebuilt, and the racing track was closed.

All that is left of the hamlet is a cemetery. The area is now a part of the village of East Syracuse.

== Geography ==
Messina Springs held three mineral springs, about 20 feet (6.1 m) apart. The hamlet was in the town of DeWitt, New York, approximately 1 mile (1.6 km) from the Erie Canal, and 3 miles (4.8 km) northeast of Syracuse, New York. It could initially be accessed by a plank road.

An 1873 account reported that the springs were consistently 50 °F (10 °C) and "strongly sulphurous."

== History ==
The Messina springs were named after Messina, Italy, by Lewis Sweeting, who was reportedly the first European to find them, around 1800 or 1820. By 1835, David Merrill had opened a boarding house nearby, advertising the springs as a site for health and recreation. They became a popular site for Syracusans to visit. A larger hotel was operating by 1850. Also that year, a horse racing track was built and post office opened.

Despite increasing popularity as a tourist destination, Messina Springs never grew larger than a hamlet. The post office closed in 1859. The hotel in Messina springs burnt down in 1879. A replacement was rebuilt, which itself burnt down in the early 1900s. It was not rebuilt. The race track was closed following the end of World War I.

As the hamlet declined, it was incorporated into the village of East Syracuse. All that remains of this community is a tiny cemetery on James Street just west of Thomson Road.
