= Lehigh Valley Railroad Station (Rochester, New York) =

Former railroad terminal in New York

Rochester
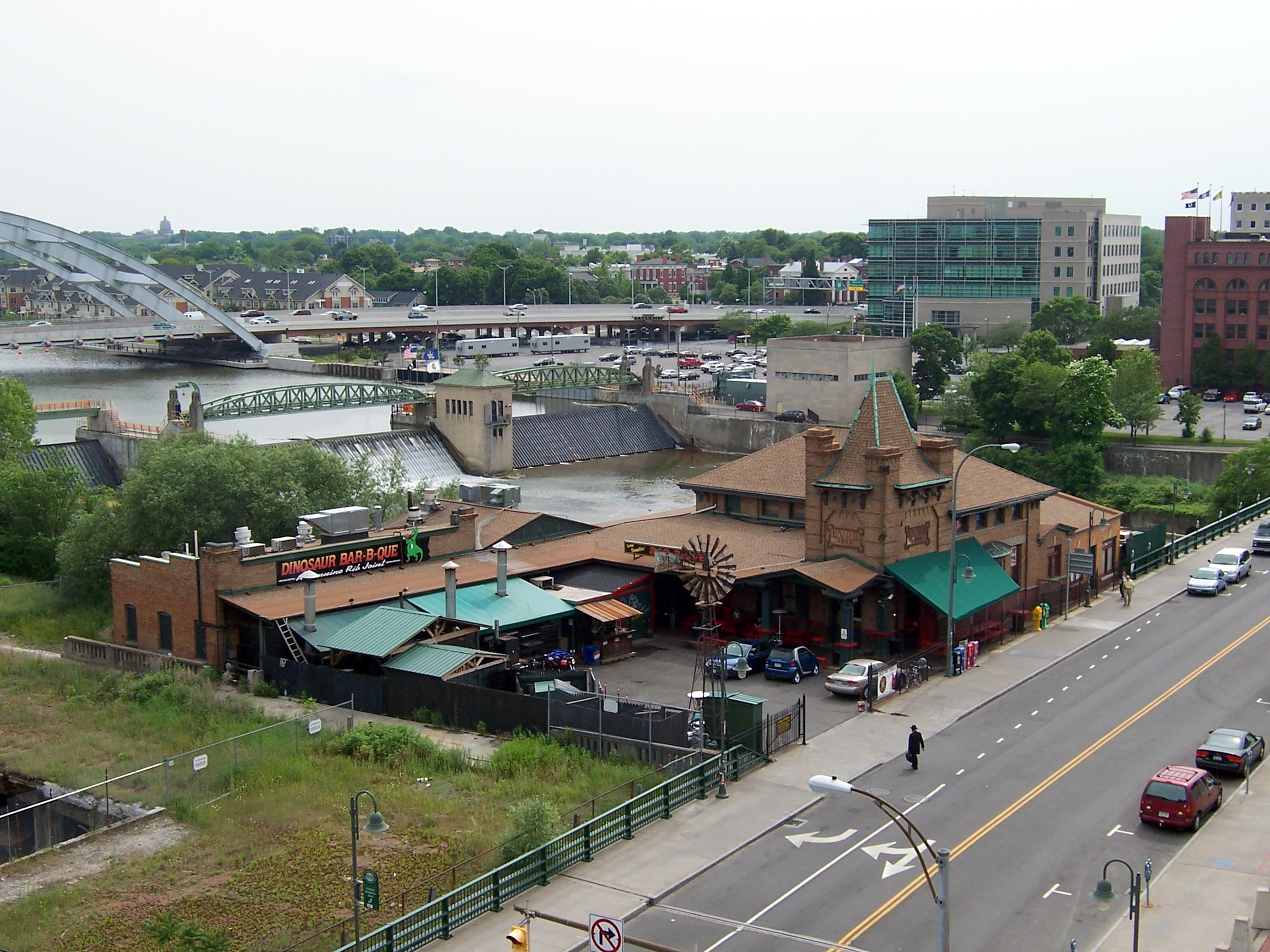
- The Rochester location of Dinosaur Bar-B-Que in June 2010

General information
- Location: 99 Court Street, Rochester, New York 14604
- Line: Rochester Branch
- Platforms: 1 island platform (former)
- Tracks: 2 (former)
- Connections: Rochester Subway (Court Street) (former)

History
- Opened: 1892
- Closed: 1950
- Rebuilt: 1905, 1982

Former lines
Preceding station	Lehigh Valley Railroad	Following station
Henrietta toward Hemlock	Rochester Branch	Terminus
- Lehigh Valley Railroad Station
- U.S. National Register of Historic Places
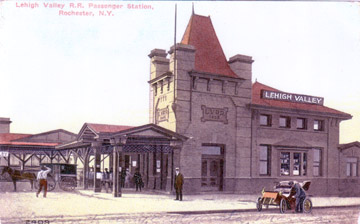
- The station shortly after completion of its construction in 1905

- Location within New York Location within the United States
- Location: 99 Court St., Rochester, New York
- Coordinates: 43°9′12″N 77°36′29″W
- Area: less than one acre
- Built: 1905
- Architect: Hyde, F.D.
- Architectural style: Late 19th And 20th Century Revivals, Gothic, French Renaissance
- MPS: Inner Loop MRA
- NRHP reference No.: 85002858
- Added to NRHP: October 04, 1985
Location

Lehigh Valley Railroad Station is a historic railway station located at Rochester in Monroe County, New York. The Lehigh Valley Railroad built the station in 1905 but stopped using the station for passenger service in the 1950s. Later the station was used as a bus terminal and then as a night club. In the 1980s the building was added to the National Register of Historic Places and today it houses the Dinosaur Bar-B-Que restaurant.

== History ==
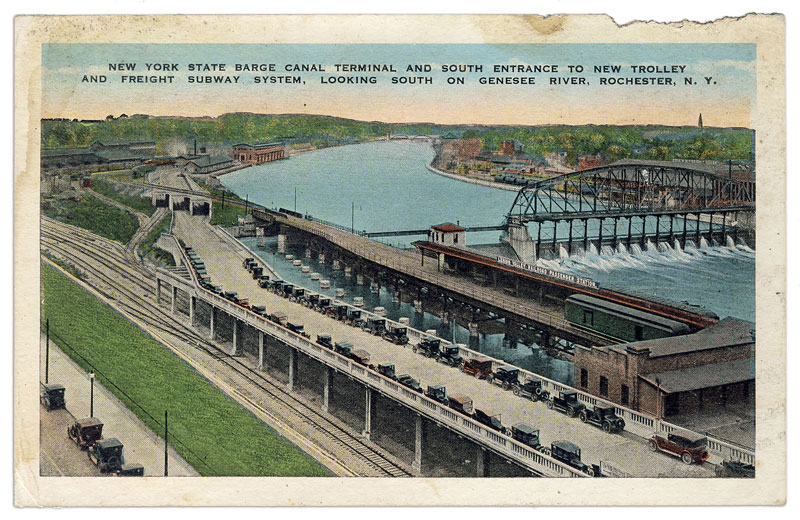
Rochester subway postcard. The Lehigh Valley Railroad Station's passenger platforms, service road, and freight terminal are visible

Around the turn of the 20th century, the Lehigh Valley Railroad was the last of several railroads to bring passenger service to Rochester. The first passenger terminal was a small wooden depot constructed a few blocks to the south of the later station, near where I-490 passes today.

The current station was built in 1905 and consisted of a passenger station and freight terminal. The buildings are located above the Johnson-Seymour mill on the Genesee River and across the river from the site of the former Erie Railroad Depot. The passenger station is a brick, hip-roofed, 1 1/2-story structure with French Renaissance overtones, including "two-toned walls, copper gutters and flashing and a red tiled roof." The freight terminal is a 1-story brick structure. Behind the buildings was two tracks and an island platform elevated above the river with the Lehigh Valley tracks heading south along the east side of the river. To the left of the buildings was an elevated service road that led to a bigger Lehigh Valley railyard.

Passenger service ended in 1950 with the decline of the railroad which began during the Great Depression and resulted in it having to restructure its debt multiple times under the Chandler Acts of 1938–9.

=== Post-train station years ===
After the ending of passenger service, the station briefly served as a bus depot, but it was abandoned completely in 1954. Around the same time, the platform and tracks from the station were demolished and most of the service road was demolished in the 1960s. The buildings became widely known as an eyesore in Rochester, and a refurbishment attempt in the 1970s failed. Local developer Max Farash bought the buildings in 1982 (for one dollar), and a two-year restoration process ensued. In 1985, the building was listed on the National Register of Historic Places.

After a few years in the 1990s as a nightclub called Carpe Diem, the buildings now house Dinosaur Bar-B-Que. In 2018, a re-development project on the site of the former Rochester Subway Court Street station and remains of the service road resulted in a luxury high rise being built next door and in one of the footings used to support the station being used to also support a pedestrian walkway called the Genesee Riverway Promenade. From the promenade, one can see the former braces on the station deck that once helped support the train platform and tracks.

== Gallery ==
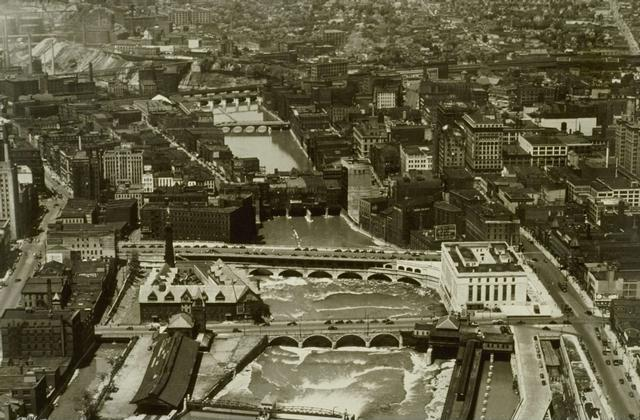
An aerial view of Rochester Downtown in the late 1930s, the Lehigh Valley Railroad Station is on the lower right

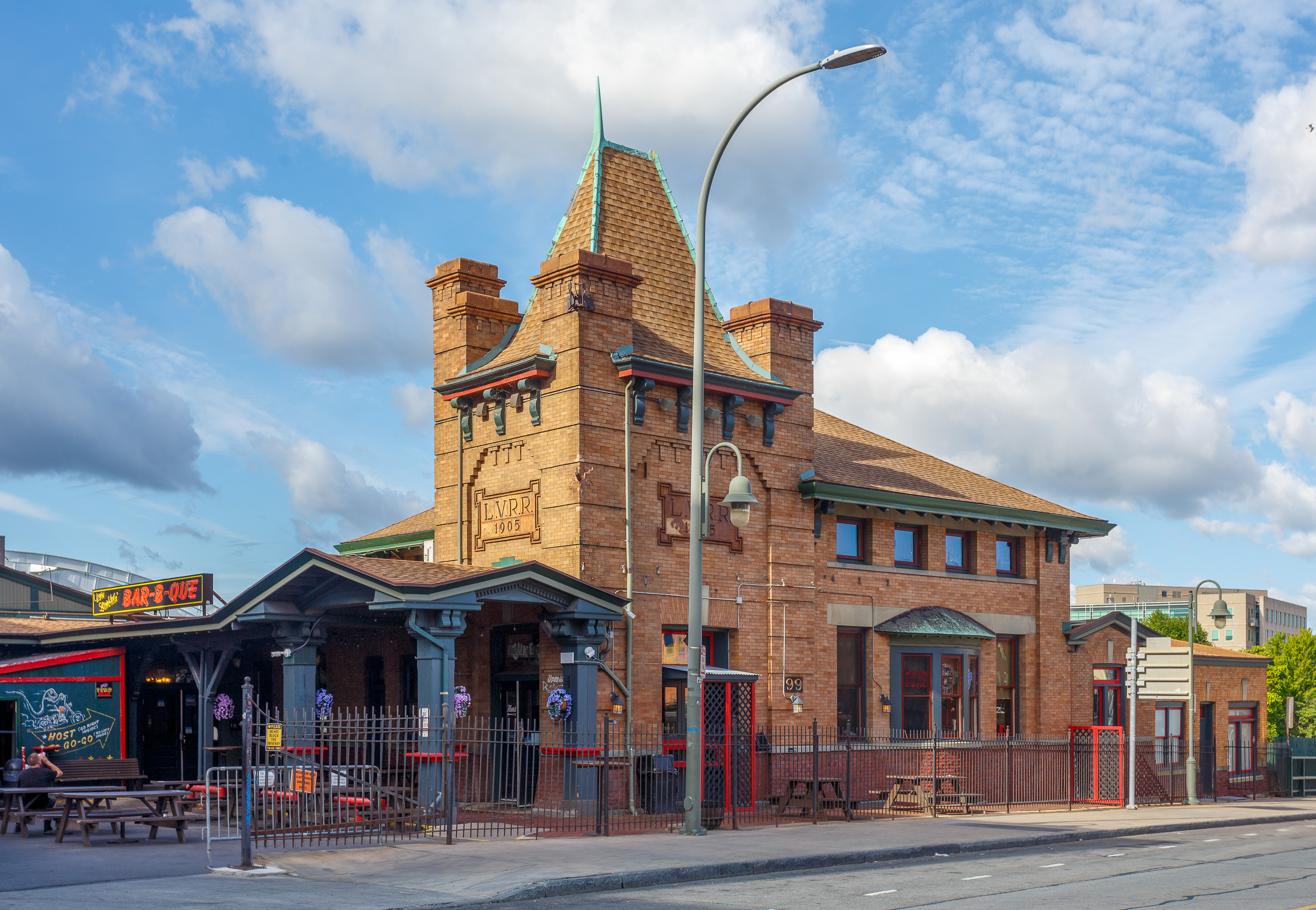
Bar-B-Que restaurant in 2022
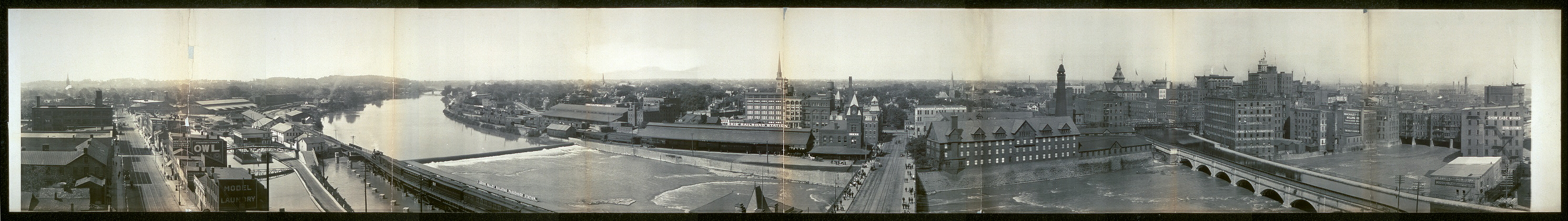
C. 1906 panorama of Rochester, the Lehigh Valley Railroad Station is in the foreground

== See also ==
- Court Street Bridge (Genesee River)
- Rundel Memorial Library
