= South Court Street =

Major street in Montgomery, Alabama

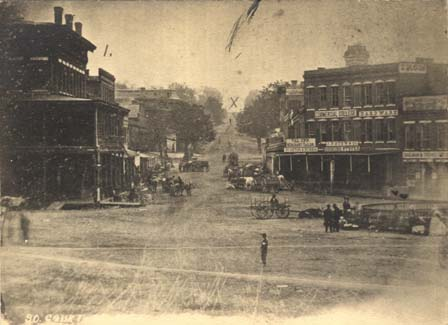
Photograph of Court Street in 1874 with Winter Building on left

South Court Street is a major thoroughfare in Montgomery, Alabama. It runs north and south ending at Courthouse Square on its north end (beyond which the street continues as North Court Street, which terminates near the Alabama River, north of Montgomery). It runs south until it becomes U.S. Route 331. A renovation project was moving towards completion in 2022.

A Korean War Memorial is at 108 South Court Street. The Freedom Rides Museum is at 210 South Court Street. The Library of Congress has Historic American Buildings Survey (HABS) photographs of the Gilmer-Shorter-Lomax House at 235 South Court Street and of the Greyhound Bus Station at 210 South Court Street. The Montgomery County Historical Society and Family Research Center, built in 1837, is at 512 South Court Street. The grounds of the Alabama Governor's Mansion also run along South Court Street, although the street address of the mansion is on the parallel Perry Street.

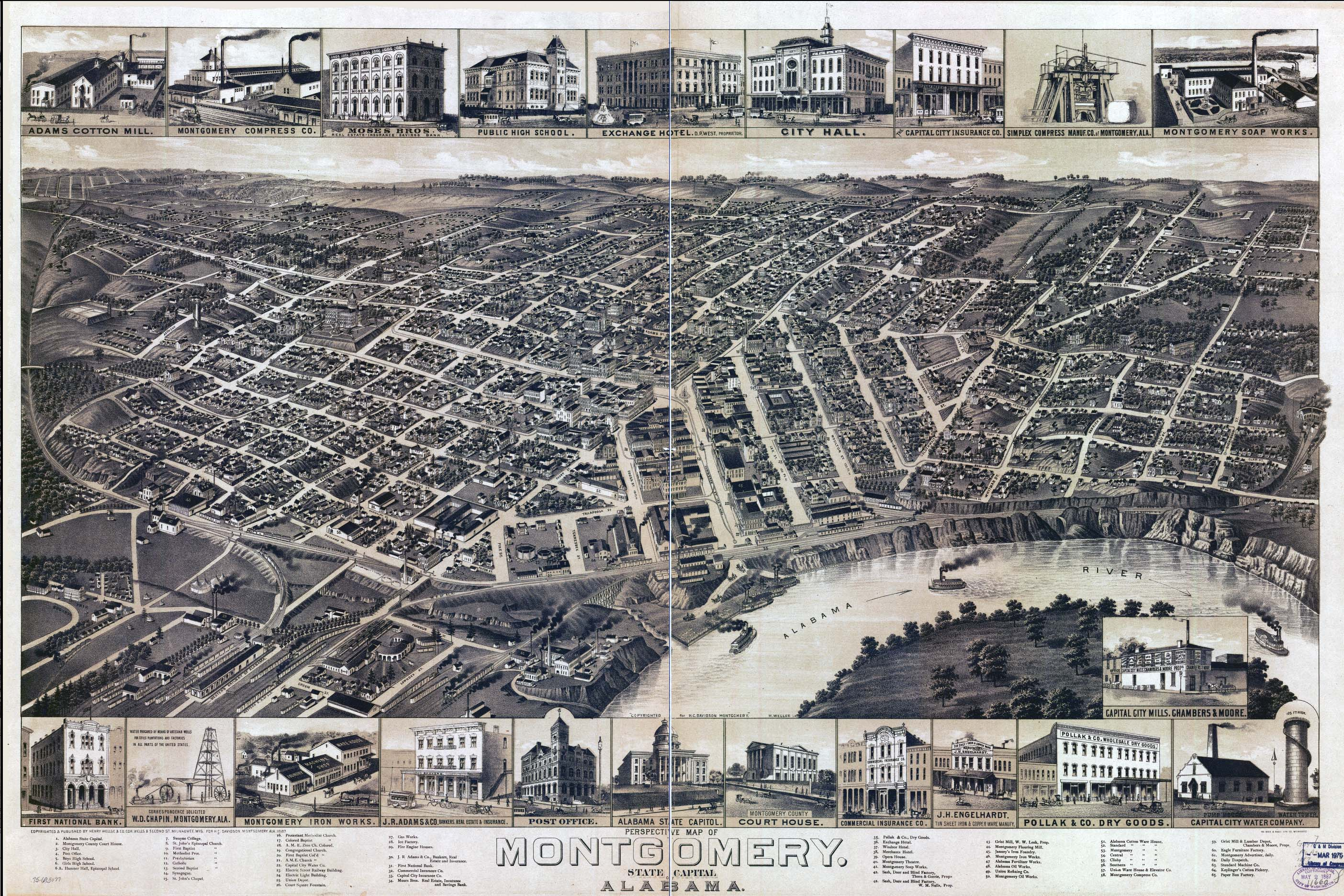
1887 Bird's Eye View of Montgomery including the Courthouse Square Fountain and Court Street

Hillcrest Manor Bed and Breakfast is at 1632 South Court Street. Memorial Presbyterian Church is at 3424 South Court Street.

The Cloverland U.S. Post Office is at 4365 South Court Street.

== History ==
The towns of New Philadelphia east of Court Street and East Alabama west of Court Street were chartered as the Town of Montgomery by the General Assembly in Cahaba December 3, 1819. A fire spread onto the street from the Alabama Journal printing office on Court Square December 16, 1838. Trolley tracks ran down the tree-lined street.
