= Court Street Historic District (Plattsburgh, New York) =

Historic district in New York, United States

- U.S. National Register of Historic Places
- U.S. Historic district
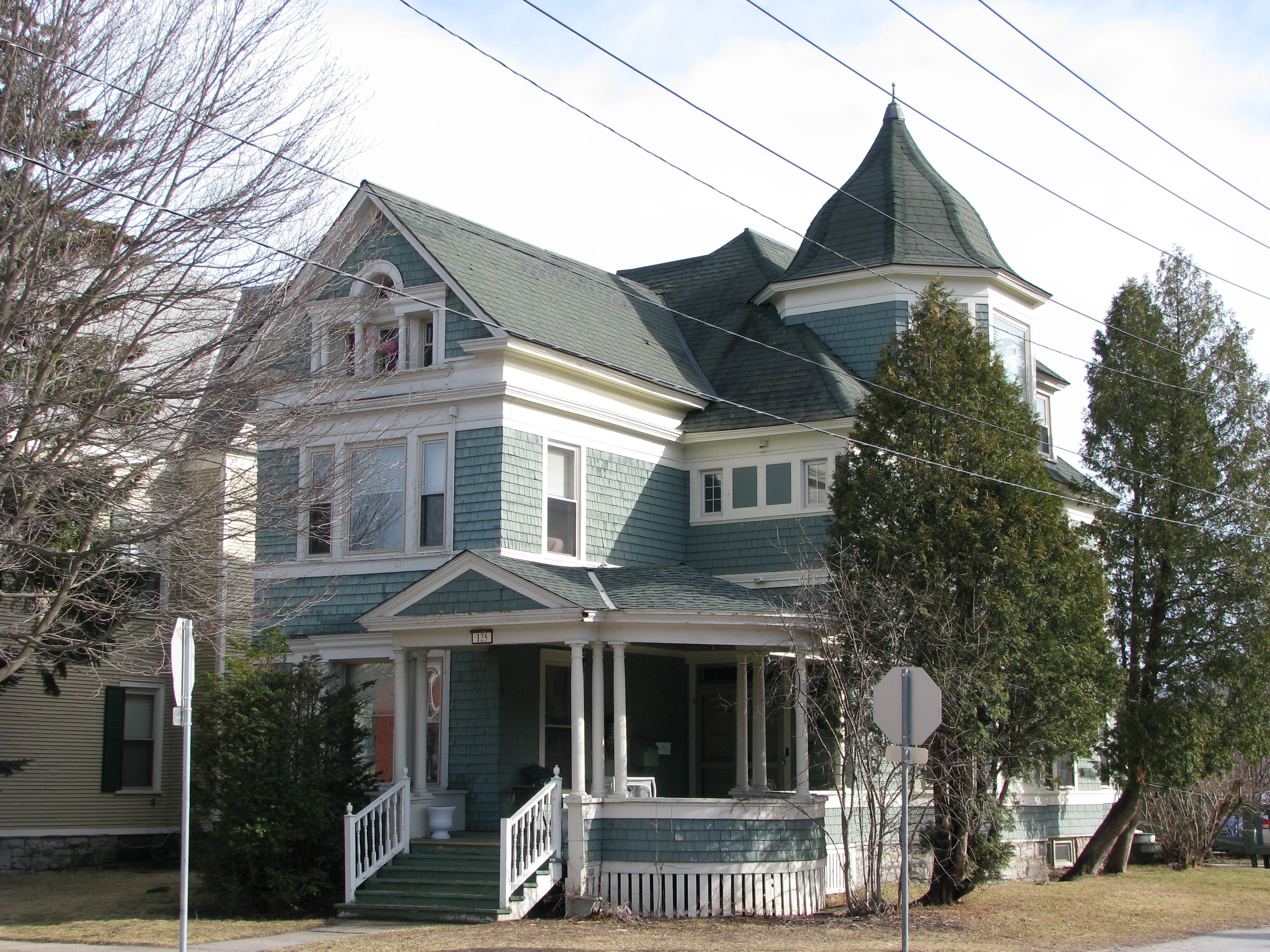
- 125 Court Street

- Location within New York Location within the United States
- Location: Court St. between Oak and Beekman Sts., Plattsburgh, New York
- Coordinates: 44°41′53″N 73°27′32″W
- Area: 21 acres (8.5 ha)
- Built: 1840
- Architectural style: Mid 19th Century Revival, Queen Anne, Colonial Revival
- MPS: Plattsburgh City MRA
- NRHP reference No.: 83001664
- Added to NRHP: February 24, 1983

Court Street Historic District is a national historic district located at Plattsburgh in Clinton County, New York. The residential district includes 51 contributing buildings. The district generally consists of large scale Queen Anne or Colonial Revival style residences built in the early 20th century, with some examples of mid-19th century Greek Revival and Italianate style residences.

It was added to the National Register of Historic Places in 1982.
