= Court Street station (Rochester) =

Former railway station in Rochester, New York, US

Court Street
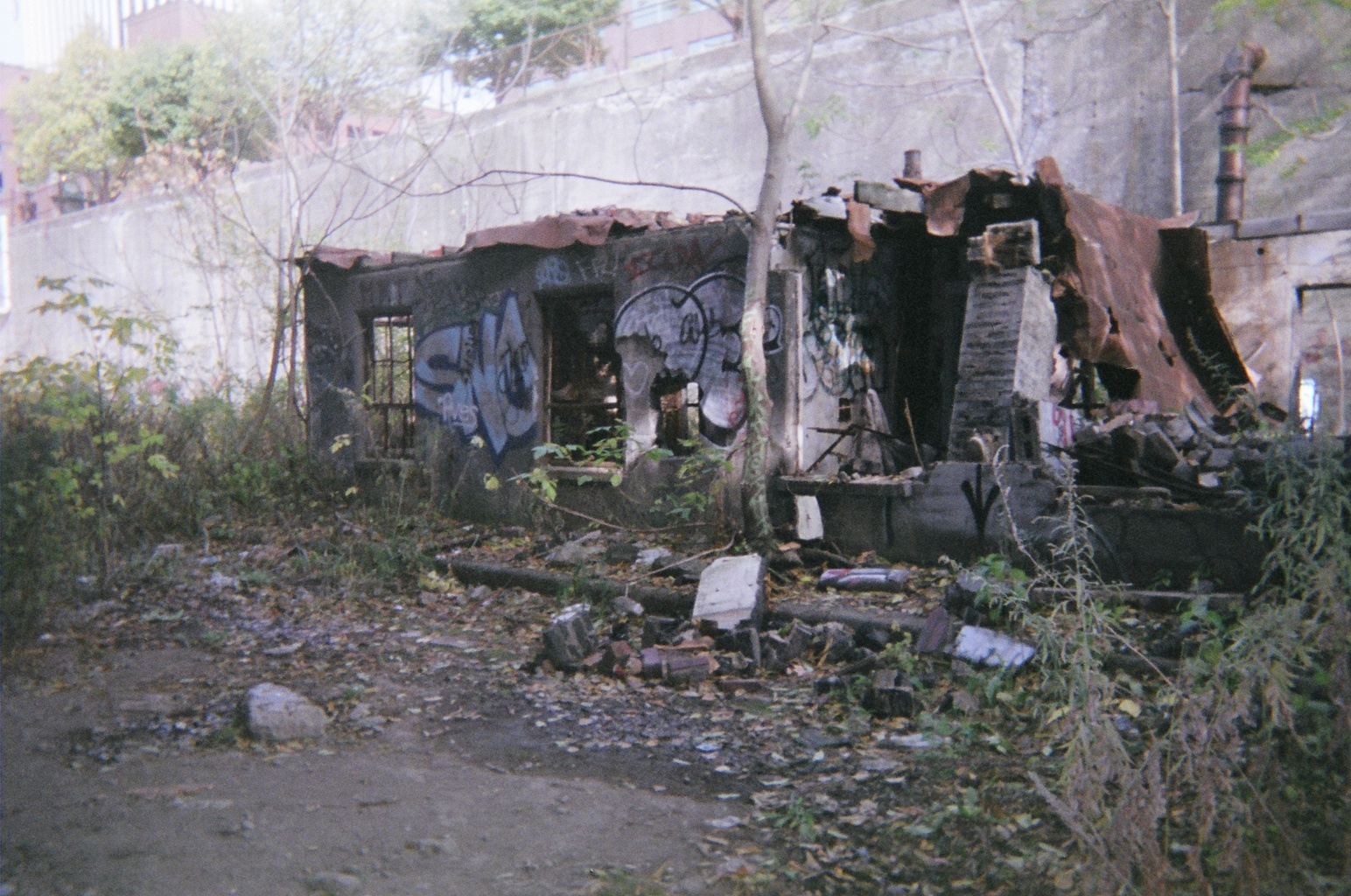
- Remains of Court Street station building (2007) before city demolition in 2017

General information
- Location: Rochester, New York; United States
- Coordinates: 43°09′12″N 77°36′28″W
- Owner: Rochester Industrial and Rapid Transit Railway
- Platforms: 1 island platform
- Tracks: 2 (former)

History
- Opened: December 1, 1927; 98 years ago
- Closed: June 30, 1956; 70 years ago

Services
Preceding station	Rochester Subway	Following station
City Hall toward General Motors	Main Line Service ended 1956	Meigs–Goodman toward Rowlands
Location

Court Street was a former Rochester Industrial and Rapid Transit Railway station located in Rochester, New York. It was closed in 1956 along with the rest of the line.

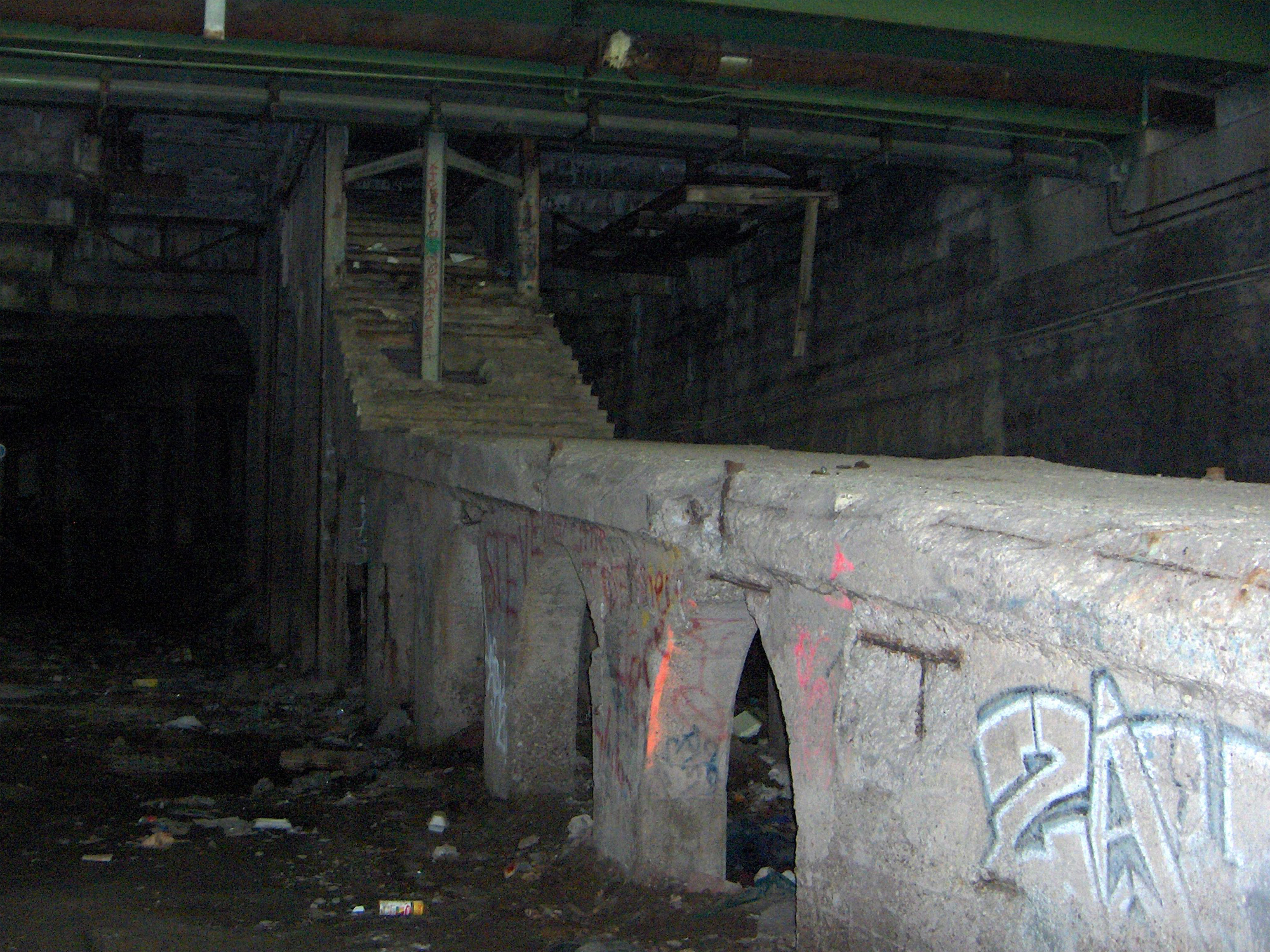
The former station staircase up to Court Street, 2005

The remains of the station were located in a cutting that had once been the bed of the Erie Canal, immediately south of the mouth of the tunnel under Court Street on the west side of South Avenue. This site is adjacent to the historic Lehigh Valley Railroad Station building and south of the Rundel Memorial Library and was nearby to the Erie Railroad Depot (Rochester, New York). Above the station was a former access road that went from Court Street to the Lehigh Valley Railroad yard that was mostly demolished in the 1960s. Alongside the station was the Johnson and Seymour Millrace. Just past the station was an elevated loop intended to connect to a streetcar line on South Avenue. There was also an electrified connection to the Lehigh Valley Railroad. The station site was destroyed in 2017 when the City of Rochester began redevelopment of the site in preparation for a luxury highrise.
