= Auburn and Syracuse Electric Railroad =

Railroad in New York

Overview
- Headquarters: Syracuse, New York
- Locale: Auburn, New York to Syracuse, New York
- Dates of operation: 1902–1930

Technical
- Track gauge: 4 ft 8 1/2 in (1,435 mm) standard gauge

The Auburn and Syracuse Electric Railroad was an interurban rail that ran from Auburn, New York to Syracuse, New York, a distance of 24 miles (39 km). The railroad owned a total of 58 miles (93 km) of track which "was as fine as any in the state."

The road was owned by Clifford D. Beebe of Syracuse. The Beebe Syndicate controlled interurbans that ran from Rochester to Syracuse, to Auburn to Oswego on Lake Ontario.

The company declared bankruptcy in 1927 and streetcar service in Auburn ended at that time; however, interurban service continued until the business was sold in early 1930. Rail service was abandoned on April 15, 1930.
