= Driving Park (Rochester, New York) =

Former racing track in Rochester, New York

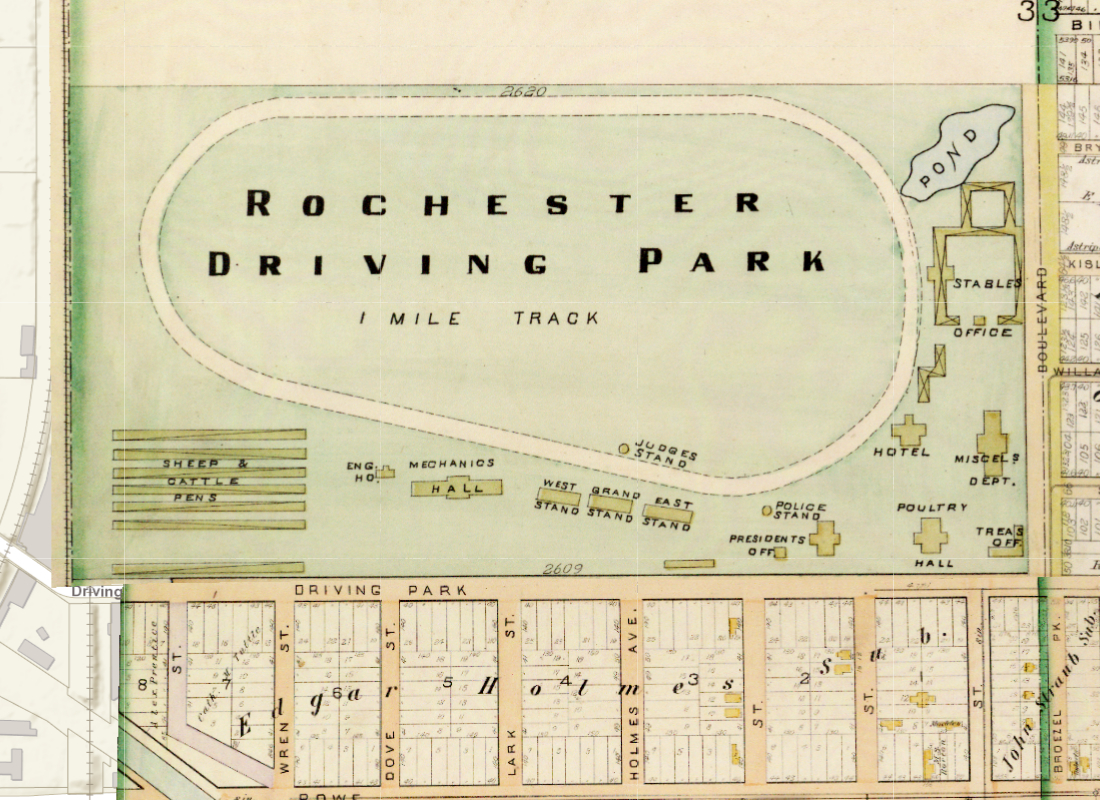
Driving Park grounds in 1888

Driving Park was a harness racing track in Rochester, New York which operated between 1874 and 1902.

The track was an irregular oval with a distance of one mile, and was described as "the fastest mile track in the United States." It was located on the north-west corner of Driving Park Avenue and Dewey Avenue, then called The Boulevard, in Rochester.

From 1875 to 1895 the track hosted a leg of the Grand Circuit. For a time it was "the most famous racetrack in the world," but began to decline in the 1890s with the introduction of anti-gambling laws. In 1899 two of the three grandstands were destroyed in a fire, and the park was finally sold at auction in 1902.

Today the former location of the park is a residential area.

== See also ==
- Driving Park station

43.181°N 77.640°W
