= Empire United Railways =

Interurban railway in New York

Overview
- Headquarters: Syracuse, New York
- Locale: Rochester to Syracuse, to Auburn to Oswego
- Dates of operation: 1912–1917
- Successor: Empire State Railway

Technical
- Track gauge: 4 ft 8 1/2 in (1,435 mm) standard gauge

The Empire United Railways was an interurban railway that was owned by Clifford D. Beebe of Syracuse, New York. The Beebe Syndicate controlled interurbans that ran from Rochester to Syracuse, to Auburn to Oswego on Lake Ontario.

The company was consolidated into the Empire State Railway in 1917.

== Gallery ==
Main gallery of images: Commons:Railroad in Syracuse, New York

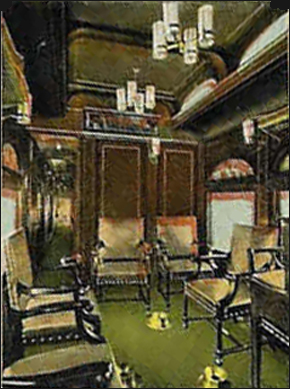
Empire United Railways interior of parlor car in 1912

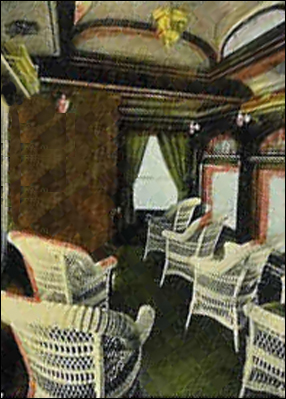
Empire United Railways interior of parlor car in 1912

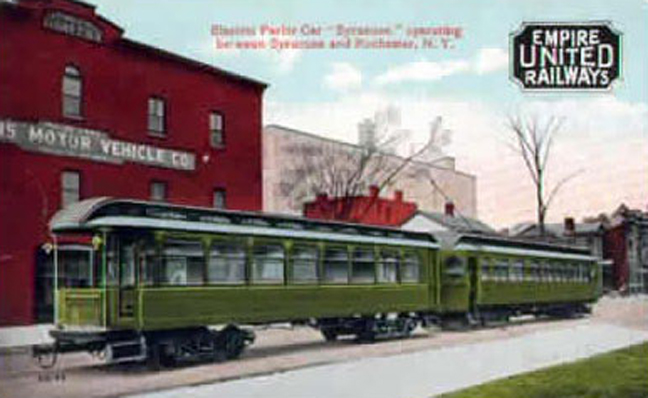
Empire United Railways parlor car Syracuse - Halloran Building in 1912
