= E Street =

E Street is the fifth of a sequence of alphabetical streets in many cities.

It may refer to:

- E Street (TV series), an Australian television soap opera
- Washington DC:
  - E Street Expressway
- The E Street Band, known for their long association with Bruce Springsteen, named after E St, Belmar, New Jersey.
- Bayfront/E Street station, known also as E Street, trolley station in San Diego, California
