= Syracuse, Lake Shore and Northern Railroad =

Overview
- Headquarters: Syracuse, New York
- Locale: Syracuse, New York to Baldwinsville, New York
- Dates of operation: 1905–1917
- Successor: Empire State Railroad Corporation

Technical
- Track gauge: 4 ft 8 1/2 in (1,435 mm) standard gauge

The Syracuse, Lake Shore and Northern Railroad, an interurban railway, was incorporated on September 9, 1905, after it was purchased by the Beebe Syndicate. The line ran from Syracuse, New York, to Baldwinsville, New York, a distance of 14 miles (23 km) with a short branch to the New York State Fair grounds ending at Long Branch Park west of the city for a total of 23.53 miles (37.87 km) of electric track.

By 1911, the company had 13 fast electric limited trains leaving Syracuse daily for Baldwinsville, Phoenix, Fulton, Minetto and Oswego.

In 1917, the company was reorganized as the Empire State Railroad, also called Empire State Railway. Streetcar service on the route ran until 1931 when it was abandoned.

Remnants of the line can be found on the campus of Charles W. Baker High School. A 10-by-12 foot concrete wall and various concrete pads were not removed during the building of the campus and were instead incorporated into the schools cross country course.
