= Court Street Bridge (Genesee River) =

- U.S. National Register of Historic Places
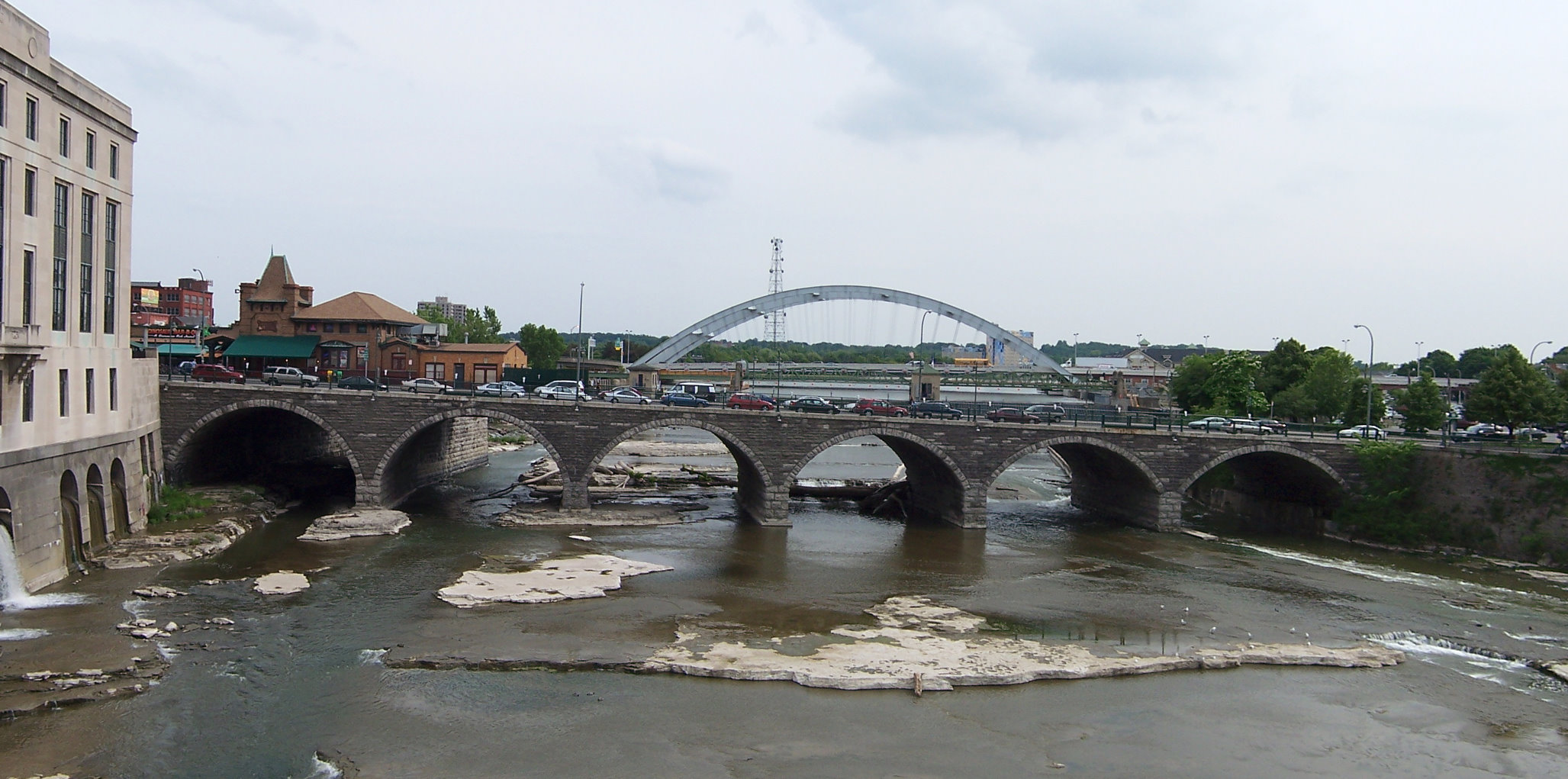
- The Court Street Bridge from the north in June 2010

- Location within New York Location within the United States
- Location: Court Street at Genesee River, Rochester, New York
- Coordinates: 43°9′12″N 77°36′34″W
- Area: less than one acre
- Built: 1893
- Architect: McClintock, J. Y.; et al
- MPS: Stone Arch Bridge TR
- NRHP reference No.: 84000276
- Added to NRHP: October 11, 1984

Court Street Bridge is a historic stone arch bridge located at Rochester in Monroe County, New York. It was designed by city engineer J. Y. McClintock, constructed in 1893, and spans the Genesee River. It has six shallow arches over the river and two arches over the Johnson and Seymour Raceway and Erie Canal. Shallow arch spans are 52 feet and rises vary from 13 to 20 feet.

It was listed on the National Register of Historic Places in 1984.

== See also ==
- National Register of Historic Places listings in Rochester, New York
