= Rochester, Syracuse and Eastern Rapid Railroad =

Rochester, Syracuse and Eastern Railroad
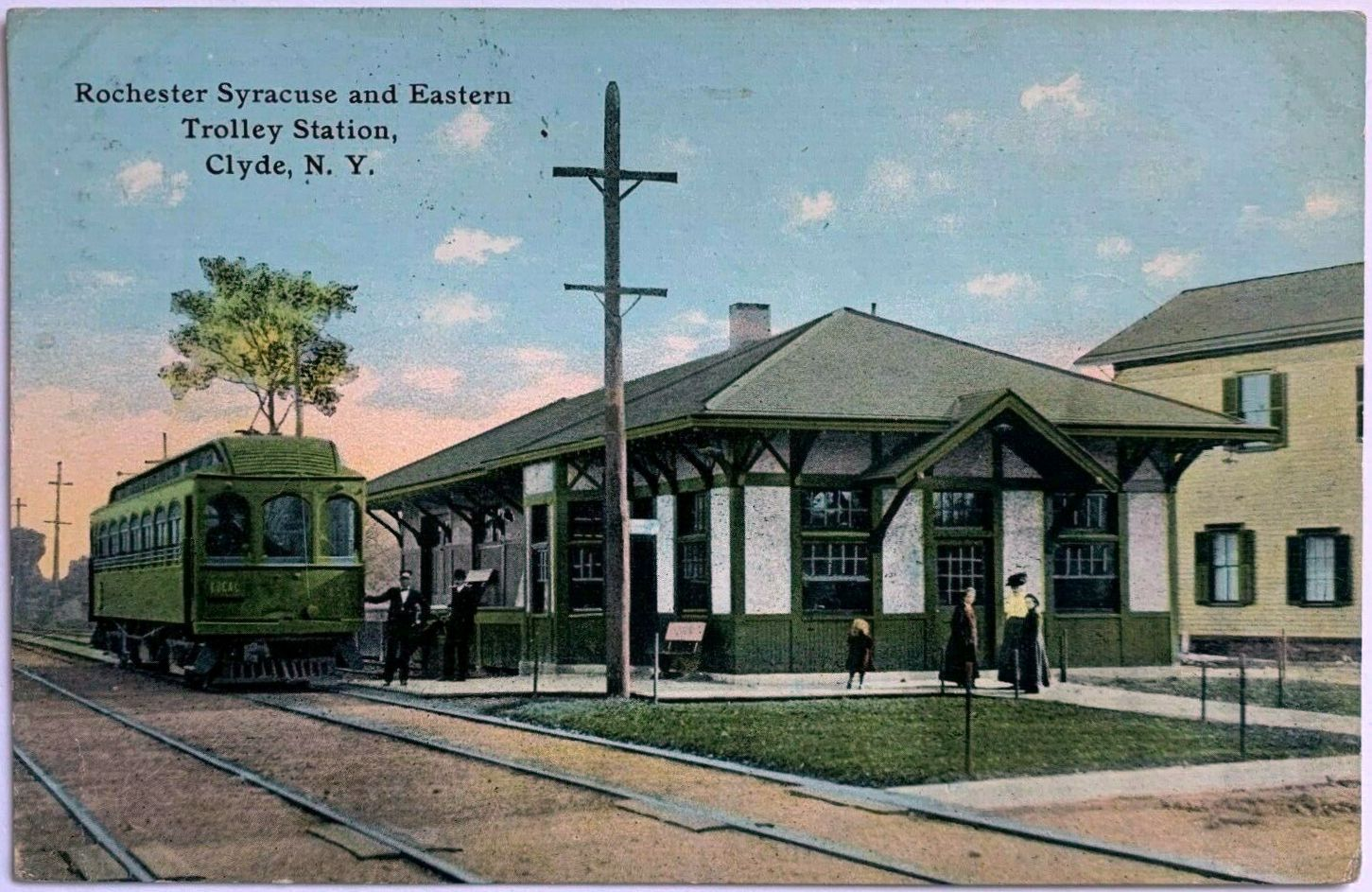
- Clyde station on a 1914 postcard

Overview
- Locale: Rochester, New York to Syracuse, New York
- Dates of operation: 1906–1917
- Successor: Rochester and Syracuse Railroad

Technical
- Track gauge: 4 ft 8 1/2 in (1,435 mm) standard gauge

The Rochester, Syracuse, and Eastern Railroad, an interurban rail, began operations in 1906 and linked Rochester, New York, with the nearby towns of Newark, Egypt, Fairport and Palmyra. At its peak the railroad was 87 miles (140 km) in length and employed steel catenary bridges over much of the line to support the trolley wire. The railroad was owned by the Beebe Syndicate, and was the only one of its properties that was designed and constructed by the management group.
