= Empire State Railway =

Interurban railway in New York

Overview
- Locale: Syracuse, New York, to Oswego, New York
- Dates of operation: 1916–1931

Technical
- Track gauge: 4 ft 8 1/2 in (1,435 mm) standard gauge

The Empire State Railway, established in 1916, was an interurban railway that ran from Syracuse, New York, to Oswego, New York, a distance of 38 miles (61 km). Streetcar service on the route ran until 1931 when it was abandoned in favor of buses.

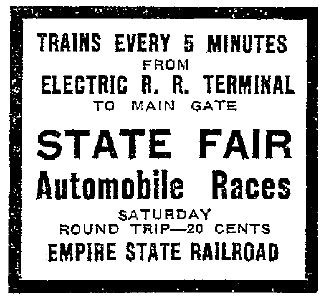
Electric Railroad Terminal - State Fair - Empire State Railroad - September 15, 1922
