= General Motors station =

Former train station

General Motors

General information
- Location: Rochester, New York; United States
- Coordinates: 43°10′58″N 77°39′14.23″W
- Owner: Rochester Industrial and Rapid Transit Railway
- Platforms: 1 side platform
- Tracks: 2 (former)

History
- Opened: 1937; 89 years ago
- Closed: 1956; 70 years ago

Services
Preceding station	Rochester Subway	Following station
Terminus	Main Line Service ended 1956	Driving Park toward Rowlands
Location

General Motors is a former Rochester Industrial and Rapid Transit Railway station and streetcar carhouse located next to the Rochester Products Division in Rochester, New York, United States. It opened in 1937 as a one-stop extension from the former terminus at Driving Park, and was closed in 1956 along with the rest of the line. The maintenance buildings still stand.
