= Rowlands station =

Railway station in Brighton, New York, United States

Rowlands

General information
- Location: Brighton, New York; United States
- Coordinates: 43°07′13″N 77°33′13″W
- Owner: Rochester Industrial and Rapid Transit Railway
- Platforms: 1 side platform
- Tracks: balloon loop

History
- Opened: December 1, 1927; 98 years ago
- Closed: June 30, 1956; 70 years ago

Services
Preceding station	Rochester Subway	Following station
Sunset toward General Motors	Main Line Service ended 1956	Terminus
Location

Rowlands is a former loop and station of the Rochester Industrial and Rapid Transit Railway located in Brighton, New York. It was closed in 1956 along with the rest of the line. The station was named after local property owner Elwell Rowland. After 1927, the Rochester and Eastern Rapid Railway connected to the Subway at Rowlands, abandoning their line up Monroe Avenue to the city line.
