= Syracuse and Geddes Railway =

Overview
- Headquarters: Syracuse, New York
- Locale: Syracuse, New York, U.S.
- Dates of operation: 1863–1890
- Successor: Syracuse Consolidated Street Railway

Technical
- Track gauge: 4 ft 8 1/2 in (1,435 mm) standard gauge

The Syracuse and Geddes Railway, a horse-drawn street trolley in Syracuse, New York, was chartered on July 10, 1863. The line ran from Syracuse to Geddes, a suburb. The route ran from Salina Street and Fayette Street to Hemlock, Bridge and Furnace Street (now Wilbur Avenue).

The company merged with Syracuse Consolidated Street Railway in 1890, after an agreement was made that allowed the new company to lease the lines.

== History ==
In early 1863, Alfred Hovey, Edward B. Wicks, William D. Stewart, John V. Barker, D. P. Wood, A. C. Powell, D. Bookstaver, and G. P. Kenyon were authorized by the city of Syracuse to lay tracks for a street railway from Salina Street and Fayette Street in Downtown Syracuse to Hemlock, Bridge and Furnace Street (now Wilbur Avenue) but at that time part of Geddes.

The company was organized on May 4, 1863, with funded debt of $25,000 and construction and equipment bonds due on December 1, 1898. Total capital stock was $50,000. Construction began at once.

In 1875, the route commenced at the corner of South Salina Street and Fayette Street and terminated in the village of Geddes. The business office was located at 2 New Savings Bank Building in Downtown Syracuse.

=== Operations ===
The business offices were initially in Geddes but by 1879, the company offices were relocated to No. 1 Onondaga County Savings Bank Building.

By 1890, the company employed both 30 and 47 pound rail and had 13 rail cars and 35 horses.

=== Company management ===
Officers of the company in 1875 included; R. N Gere, president; Charles Tallman, vice-president; R. A. Bonta, secretary and treasurer; and William J. Hart, superintendent.

By 1894, the directors of the company were Daniel P. Wood, Peter Burns, Charles Andrews, George A. Kennedy, Charles T. Redfield, Jonathan G. Wynkoop, George C. Gere, Isaac R. Pharis, Charles E. Hubbell, T. W. Meachem, all of Syracuse. R. N. Gere was president and R. A. Bonta was secretary and treasurer of the company. William J. Hart was the superintendent.

=== Financial ===
Annual meetings were held on the second Monday in January.

=== Syracuse consolidated lease agreement ===
The Syracuse Consolidated Street Railway was chartered in 1890 in Syracuse and by July 1, 1890, the new company leased, in perpetuity, several street railroads in the city including the Syracuse and Geddes Railway as well as the Third Ward Railway, Fourth Ward Railroad, Fifth Ward Railroad, Seventh Ward Railroad, Eleventh Ward Railroad, Genesee and Water Street Railroad, Woodlawn and Butternut Street Railway and New Brighton and Onondaga Valley Railroad. The rail ran a total distance of 24 miles (39 km) and had branches every 3 miles (4.8 km). At that time, the Syracuse and Geddes Railway ceased to exist.

Syracuse Consolidated Street Railway filed for bankruptcy in 1893 and merged with the Syracuse Rapid Transit Railway Company in May 1896.
