= Canandaigua Street Railroad =

Streetcar line in Canandaigua, New York, US

Overview
- Headquarters: Canandaigua, New York
- Locale: Canandaigua, New York
- Dates of operation: 1887–1930
- Successor: Rochester and Eastern Rapid Railway; New York State Railways

Technical
- Track gauge: 4 ft 8 1/2 in (1,435 mm)

Chartered in 1886, the Canandaigua Street Railroad was a local streetcar line serving the lakeside city of Canandaigua, New York, beginning in 1887. The railroad was sold to the Canandaigua Electric Light and Railroad which rebuilt and electrified the line in 1892. The Ontario Light and Traction Company purchased it in 1900, and leased the line to the Rochester and Eastern Rapid Railway in 1903. In 1905, the line came under the control of the Mohawk Valley Company, and in turn, New York State Railways in 1909. Operation was converted to bus operation some time in the 1920s, but this service ended when the Rochester and Eastern Rapid Railway shut down on July 31, 1930. The lease of the former Canandaiua lines was allowed to lapse.

== Early history (1887–1905) ==
The line began operating as a horse car line on September 6, 1887, with a two-mile extension following a month later. Stretching from the steamship wharf at the north end of Canandaigua Lake, the line ran along Main Street to the western edge of town. A branch to the fairgrounds was opened in 1889. All cars met the steamships that brought passengers across Canandaigua Lake. The railroad closed in July 1892, and was sold to the Canandaigua Electric Light and Railroad Company which electrified and rebuilt the lines for streetcar operation in 1893. A hydro-electric plant in Littleville provided the power for the streetcar line.

The Ontario Light and Traction Company purchased the line on June 1, 1900, maintaining local service in the city. In 1901, the Rochester and Eastern Rapid Railway was chartered to build a new interurban line between Rochester and Geneva. Headquartered in Canandaigua, the Rochester and Eastern Rapid Railway leased the Ontario Light and Traction line in 1903 to gain access through the city limits. At this time the power plant in Littleville and the substation on Phoenix Street were abandoned because the Rochester and Eastern had built a larger power plant of its own in Canandaigua. In 1905 the branches serving the fairground and the steamship wharf were abandoned.

== Control by New York State Railways (1906–1930) ==
The New York Central Railroad began taking an interest in the streetcar and interurban railways springing up along their territory. The Mohawk Valley Company was formed in 1905 to take control of the Rochester Railway Company, the Rochester and Sodus Bay Railway, and the Rochester and Eastern Rapid Railway. In 1909 these properties were combined to form New York State Railways, and the Canandaigua route became part of the Rochester Lines. In 1917, the electric utility properties of the Ontario Light & Traction were sold to the Rochester Railway and Light Co., leaving the railway property in control of New York State Railways.

The Canandaigua line was never particularly busy, as two streetcars were assigned to the line to handle all of the traffic. Known locally as "The Dinky," streetcars would run from the Orphans Asylum down to the lake and back. Sometime in the late 1920s, local city operation was converted to bus, but continued to be operated by New York State Railways. The Great Depression brought fewer customers and increased competition from better highways and more automobiles joining the roads. When the Rochester and Eastern Rapid Railway shut down for good on July 31, 1930, the lease of the Ontario Light and Traction was allowed to lapse. Ontario Light and Traction did not resume independent operation, and the streetcar era came to a close in Canandaigua.

== Bibliography ==
- King, Shelden S. (1975). The New York State Railways. Elmira, New York: Whitehall Mail Service.
