= Rochester and Sodus Bay Railway =

Overview
- Headquarters: Rochester, New York
- Dates of operation: 1889–1933
- Predecessor: Rochester and Glen Haven Railroad; Irondequoit Park Railroad
- Successor: New York State Railways

Technical
- Track gauge: 4 ft 8 1/2 in (1,435 mm)
- Previous gauge: 3 ft (914 mm)
- Electrification: 620v DC
- Length: 39 miles (63 km)

The Rochester and Sodus Bay Railway was an electric interurban railway connecting Rochester with the shores of Lake Ontario at Sodus Point. The line was leased to the Rochester Railway Company in 1902 and later merged into New York State Railways in 1909. Ridership dropped off in the 1920s, and the railway east of Glen Haven was abandoned in 1929. The remaining local streetcar service ended in 1933.

== Early history (1887–1896) ==
The Rochester and Glen Haven Railroad was chartered in 1887 to build a narrow gauge steam-powered railroad to connect Rochester with the resort area of Glen Haven on Irondequoit Bay. The Rochester and Glen Haven Railroad connected to the horse car line of the Rochester City and Brighton Railroad at East Main and Chamberlain streets. When the railroad opened for service in 1889, it was still under construction. The full length of the line was completed in 1891. The Glen Haven Hotel opened on the western shores of Irondequoit Bay in 1889, and in the years following many other developments and attractions were built in the area including the Glen Haven Park amusement park. In 1893 the line was foreclosed and reorganized as the Glen Haven Railroad.

Both the railroad and the hotel fell on hard times and two years later the line suspended service. The receiver was Chauncey C. Woodworth, who previously became a partner in Rochester Railway Company in 1868. The Rochester and Glen Haven Railroad was sold at auction to Woodworth and Frank P. Crouch (original vice president of the railroad) and reorganized as the Irondequoit Park Railroad. The route was converted to standard gauge and the electrification process began. On May 30, 1896, electric trolleys began service between East Main Street station in Rochester and Glen Haven. Rebuilding the line eliminated the need for city passengers to transfer to continue their ride to Glen Haven. Service was operated every 20 minutes, and the railroad continued to invest in the betterment of Glen Haven Park.

== Expansion and acquisition (1896–1909) ==
With the moderate success of the Glen Haven line, the Rochester and Sodus Bay Railway was incorporated in 1898 to build an interurban railway to reach the resort town of Sodus Point on the shores of Lake Ontario. Construction began in 1899 and soon the double-track railroad reached Williamson, Sodus, and up to Sodus Point. Service to Ontario began on July 4, 1900, Full service over the entire length of the line to Sodus Point commenced on August 22, 1900. Sodus Bay cars used Rochester Railway Company tracks to reach downtown and turnback at Plymouth Avenue.

The Irondequoit Park Railroad was leased by the Rochester and Sodus Bay Railway in 1901, and formally merged in 1902. That same year, the Rochester and Sodus Bay Railway was leased by the Rochester Railway Company. In 1903, the entire line was rebuilt with heavier 60-pound (27,000 g) and 70-pound (32,000 g) rail. The Rochester Railway Company formed the Glen Haven Improvement Company to purchase Glen Haven Park from Woodworth and Crouch. The amusement park continued to benefit from upgrades that lured even more customers to the shores of Irondequoit Bay. Beginning in 1905, Sodus Bay cars originated from the downtown Rochester interurban terminal shared with the Rochester and Eastern Rapid Railway at Court and Exchange streets (near the Erie Railroad terminal). In 1909, the Rochester Railway Company was acquired by New York State Railways, and the Rochester and Sodus Bay Railway was operated as part of the Rochester Lines division.

== New York State Railways (1909–1933) ==
Automatic block signals were installed along the Rochester and Sodus Bay line between 1913 and 1914, a welcome safety feature given the high density schedule that was operated at the time. Glen Haven Park (renamed "Dreamland") continued to be an important source of income through the World War I era, but Prohibition marked the beginning of its demise and forcing the closure of the famed Glen Haven Hotel. Despite the decline of the resorts, passenger traffic to Glen Haven remained steady. In 1925, Sodus Bay cars abandoned the Rochester downtown interurban terminal and instead originated from the Blue Bus Lines depot on South Avenue.

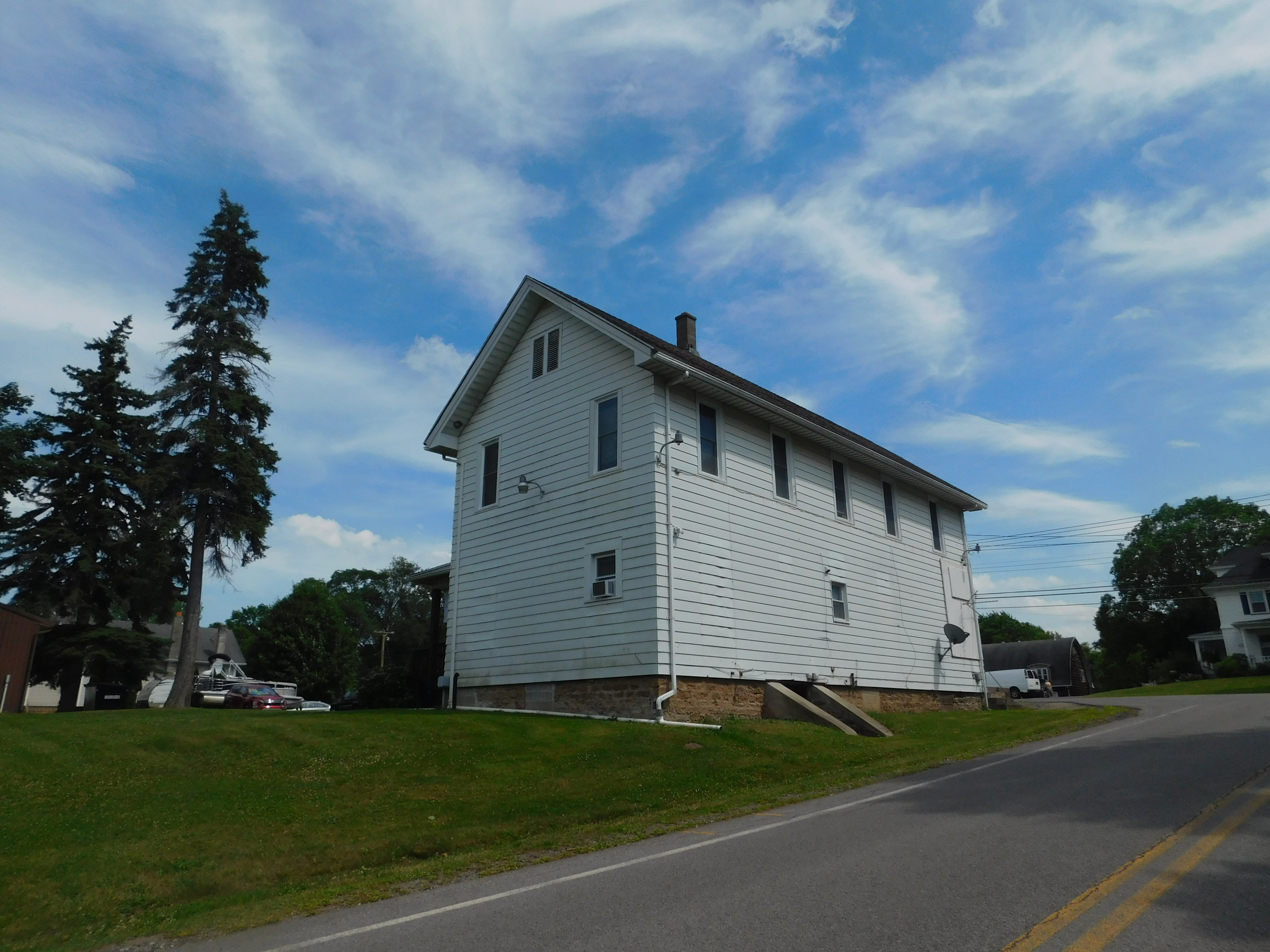
Fruitland station in July 2024

The first car to operate in the new city-owned Rochester Subway was Rochester and Sodus Bay Railway car 171 departing from City Hall station on December 1, 1927. The subway was designed to remove interurbans from the city streets and provide a swift ride through the city. Cars 170 and 171 were temporarily assigned to Rochester Subway service until replacements were secured from the Utica Lines. Of all the interurban lines serving Rochester, only the Rochester and Sodus Bay Railway did not use the subway. Plans were drawn up to build a new connection and ramp into the subway at Culver Road, but never came to fruition.

Better roads and increased use of automobiles led to declining ridership through the 1920s. The old Glen Haven resort hotel burned to the ground in 1928. The line from Glen Haven east to Sodus Point was shut down on June 27, 1929, ending interurban service. Local service continued between Main and Oak streets in Rochester to Glen Haven for a few more years before resuming from its normal origination point at East Main Street. The Glen Haven line was designated Route 13, falling in with the system of bus route numbers implemented by Rochester Railway Company. New York State Railways entered receivership on December 31, 1929. Due to better roads and increase automobile use, traffic on the Glen Haven line dropped off dramatically, and streetcar service ended on July 19, 1933. The transit franchises were later transferred to the new Rochester Transit Corporation in 1938, which operated the Route 30 Webster–Sodus bus along the same route.

== Disposition ==
The property of the Sodus Bay interurban was sold at public auction in Lyons on November 10, 1931. Rochester Gas and Electric Corp. retained the rights to the trolley company electric poles from Webster on east. The organization acquired a former railroad powerhouse at Float Bridge for $3,000. Farmers along the 6 miles (9.7 km) of right-of-way not along a public highway purchased the alignment according to New York state law. Williamson depot went to J.W. Barnes for $2,500. Leon Hill purchased Wallington depot for $3,700 for the intent of turning the structure into a gas station.

Ownership of the Glen Haven Park property passed on to successor Rochester Transit Corporation, who sold the land through its Railway Properties Corporation subsidiary to Edward M. Hayden in 1946. Today the land is vacant with no trace of the buildings that once stood. The old railway grade through the city limits was acquired by Rochester Gas & Electric for use as a transmission line right of way, and is easily followed today. Some sections of railroad grade are still visible around Irondequoit Bay to this day. The body of Car 113 resides at the Seashore Trolley Museum in Kennebunkport, Maine, awaiting evaluation for future restoration.

== Station listing ==
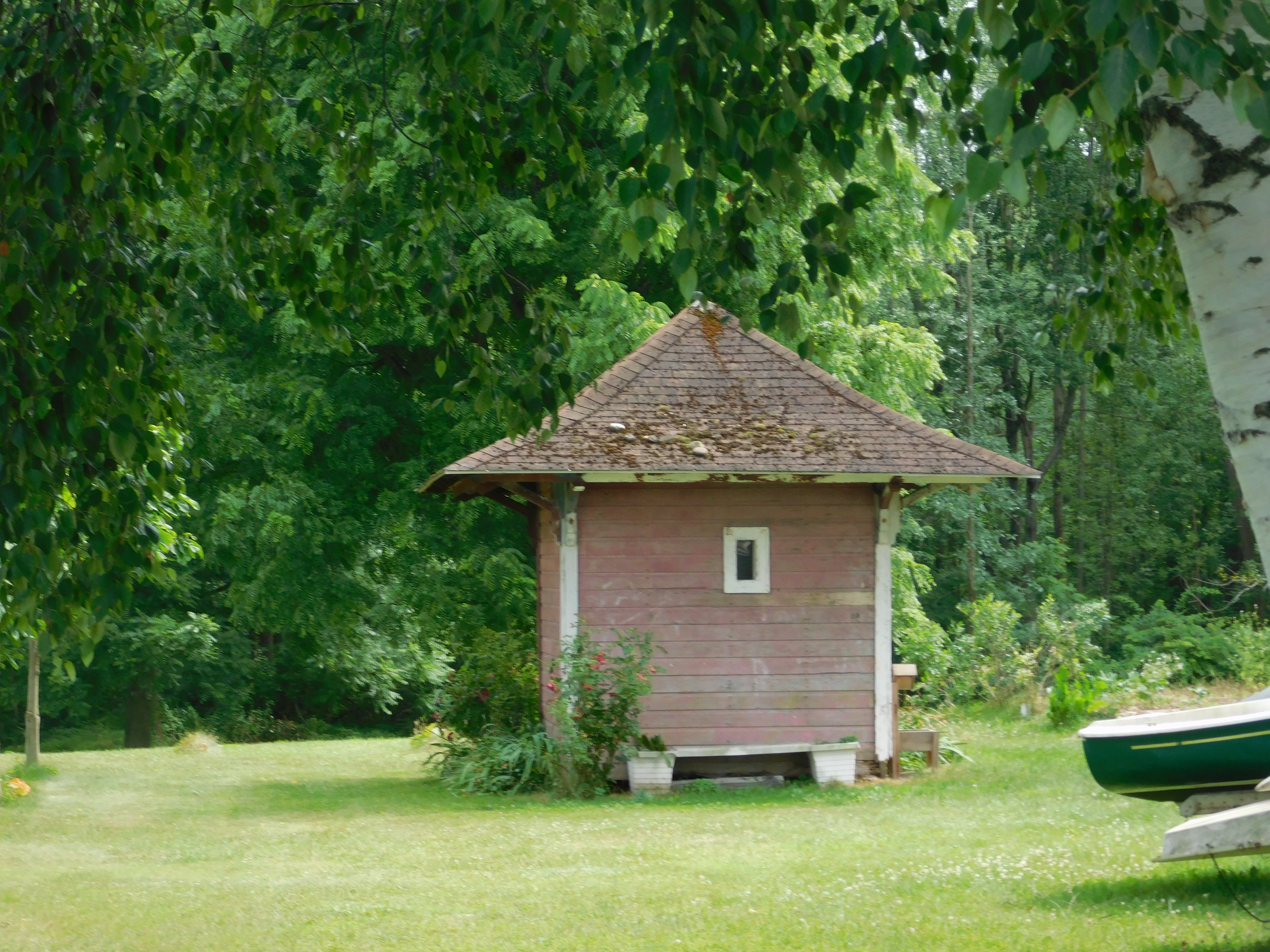
East Williamson station in July 2024

From Rochester Railway timetable effective May 25, 1908. Local (non-agency) stops and sidings omitted:

- Court and Exchange Streets, Rochester (Interurban Terminal)
- East Main Street, Rochester (connection with Rochester Railway Company)
- Glen Haven Junction
- Dayton's Corners
- Glen Edith
- West Webster
- Webster
- Union Hill
- Fruitland
- Ontario Center
- Ontario
- Williamson
- East Williamson
- Sodus
- Wallington
- Sodus Point

== Bibliography ==
- Amberger, Ronald (1985). Canal Boats, Interurbans and Trolleys: The History of the Rochester Subway. Rochester, New York: Rochester Chapter NRHS. ISBN 0-9605296-1-6.
- Gordon, William R. (1975). Ninety Four Years of Rochester Railways, Vol. 1. Rochester, New York. ISBN 0-910662-12-6.
- Lowe, Charles R. (2000). Trolleys to Glen Haven. Fleischmanns, New York: Purple Mountain Press. ISBN 978-1930098138.
- Reifschneider, Felix E. (1949). Interurbans of the Empire State. Orlando, Florida.
