= Central City Railway =

Overview
- Headquarters: Syracuse, New York
- Locale: Syracuse, New York
- Dates of operation: 1859–1890
- Successor: People's Railroad which merged with Syracuse Rapid Transit Railway

Technical
- Track gauge: 4 ft 8 1/2 in (1,435 mm) standard gauge

The Central City Railway was chartered on April 19, 1859, and was the first street railway company in Syracuse, New York. It began operations in August 1860, as a horse-drawn rail. The road was discussed for many years before it was actually constructed as a link between the First Ward and Erie Canal at Salina Street. The train line commenced at South Salina Street opposite the Syracuse House and terminated in the First Ward.

During 1890, the company merged with People's Railroad which merged again into Syracuse Rapid Transit Railway in 1896.
