= New York Museum of Transportation =

Railroad museum in Rush, New York

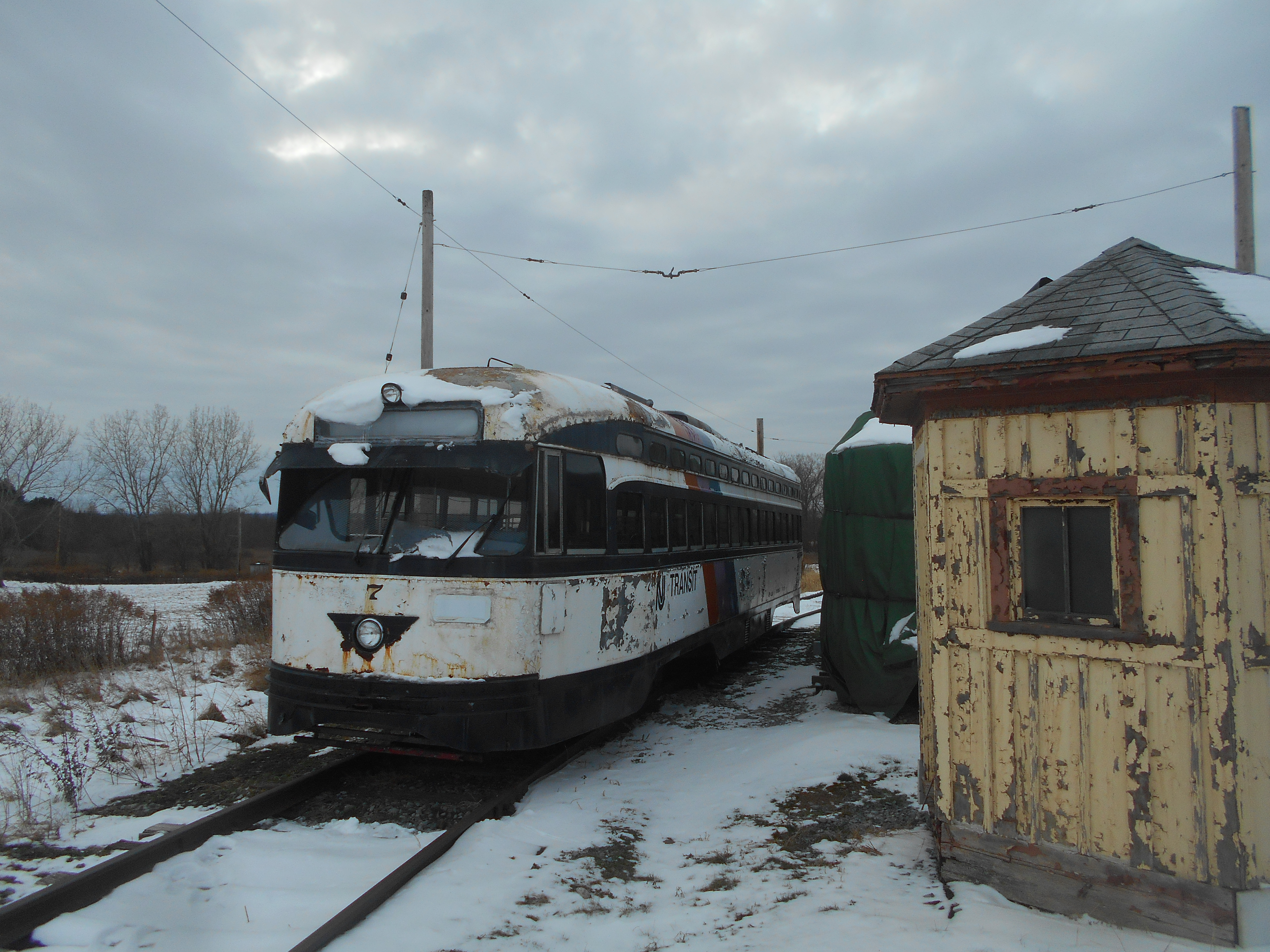
- The former Newark City Subway streetcar used by New Jersey Transit on the museum property in January 2015.
- Established: 1973
- Location: Rush, New York
- Coordinates: 43°00′59″N 77°42′36″W
- Type: Railroad museum
- Website: http://www.nymtmuseum.org

The New York Museum of Transportation (NYMT), founded in 1975, is a non-profit organization located at 6393 East River Road, in Rush, a suburb of Rochester, New York. A private rail line built by volunteers connects NYMT with the Rochester & Genesee Valley Railroad Museum, over a distance of two miles. This demonstration railway allows both museums to offer train rides with their collections of vintage railroad equipment. NYMT operates the only electric trolley ride in New York State, not to be confused with the similarly named Trolley Museum of New York located in Kingston, New York.

== History ==
The last streetcars operated in Rochester in 1941, leaving only the Rochester Subway rapid transit operation to soldier on until 1956. Rochester Transit Corporation donated car 1246, a Peter Witt-style streetcar, to the Rochester Museum and Science Center in 1941, but the museum never made any attempt to incorporate the car into a permanent exhibition. Stored outdoors and ravaged by vandals, the car was finally sold for scrap in 1950. Rochester Subway car 60 was donated to the Rochester Chapter, NRHS in 1956, but having no permanent location, the car was loaned to other organizations outside the region.

The roots of the New York Museum of Transportation can be traced back to the Magee Transportation Museum, a private museum located near Bloomsburg, Pennsylvania, founded by wealthy industrialist Harry Magee, the owner of the Magee Carpet Company. His interest in vintage vehicles of all kinds led him to create a home for antique automobiles and trolleys in the mid-1960s. The museum and trolley rides flourished until the summer of 1972 when flooding caused by Hurricane Agnes caused extensive damage to the tracks and trolley fleet. Harry Magee died that October, and the collection was sold at auction in 1973.

The planned community of Riverton was being developed in West Henrietta, New York by Henry Hamlin. The cornerstone of this new project was a proposed light rail line that was to connect Riverton with downtown Rochester constructed along the former Erie Railroad Rochester Division right of way. A small trolley museum was envisioned as a natural outgrowth of the planned light rail line. With the knowledge that several Rochester area streetcars were preserved at the Magee Transportation Museum, Hamlin made a visit to see what could be salvaged from the shuttered museum.

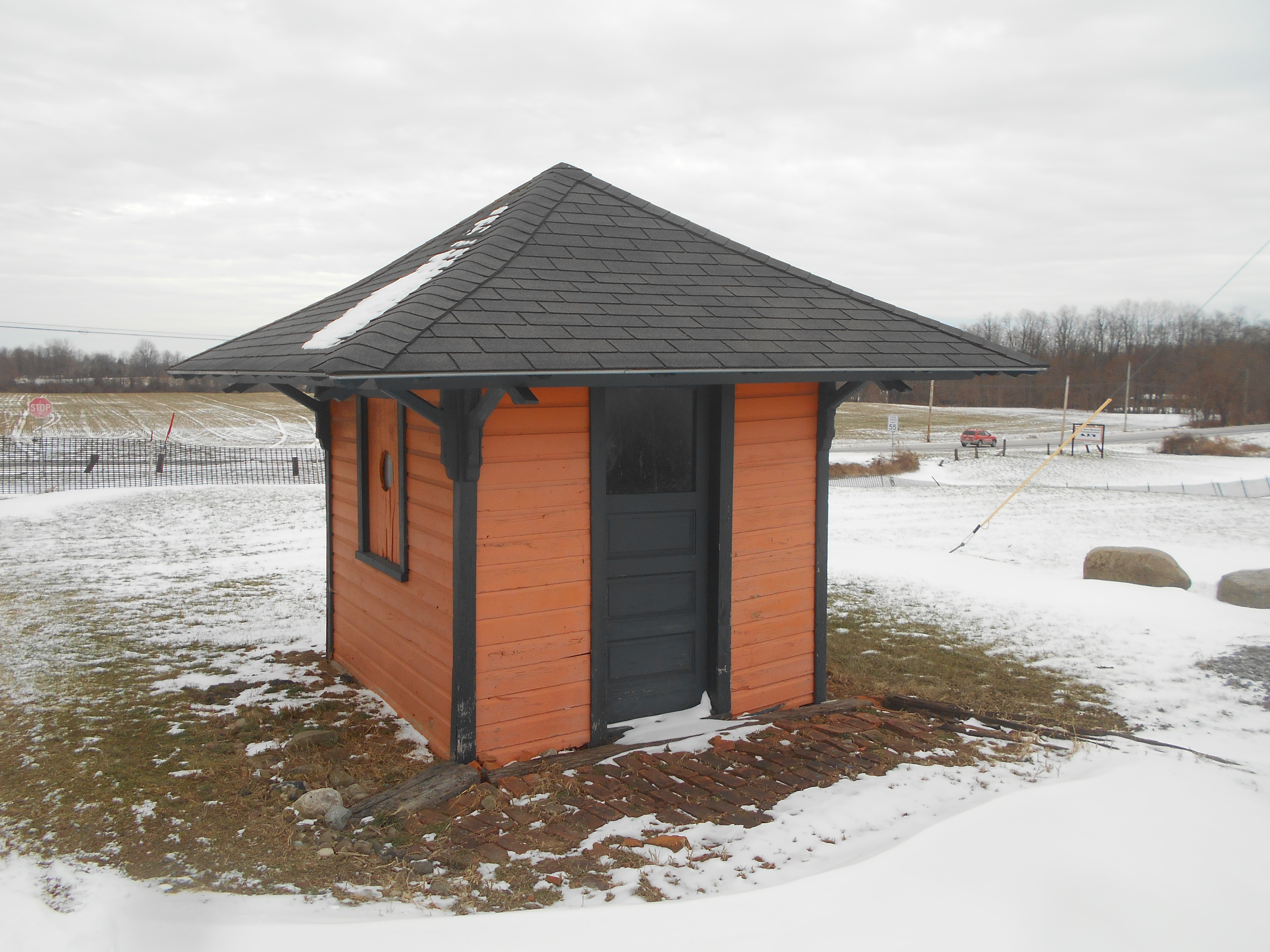
The former station for the Rochester and Eastern Rapid Railway near Canandaigua located on the museum's front lawn

Before his untimely death, Harry Magee had expressed hope that the Rochester streetcars in his collection could one day be returned to New York State to be restored and operate once again. The first car acquired was former Elmira, Wavery and Corning Railway car 107, as well as a stock of bracket arms and other stock to construct overhead wire. New York State Railways Rochester and Eastern Rapid Railway car 157 was also acquired in the same deal. Lease of a recently abandoned dairy barn on state agricultural lands in West Henrietta was acquired by Hamlin to house the two cars. Temporary tracks were laid and car 157 was placed inside the barn on October 5, 1973, with car 107 following a month later. Rochester Transit Corporation sand car 0243 and Rochester City and Brighton Railroad horse car 55 were brought to the barn site, on loan from the Rochester Museum and Science Center. A provision charter was issued in 1975, bringing formal organization to the New York Museum of Transportation.

By 1975, the city of Rochester was looking to abandon the remaining western end of the old Rochester Subway, which was still being used for freight service by both Penn Central and the Baltimore & Ohio railroads under contract. The NYMT volunteers were given permission to salvage as much of the track materials as they could for the construction of the rail line circling their campus in West Henrietta. Addition historic vehicles were added to the collection from various sources, and a gift shop, exhibit hall, and gallery were completed inside the old dairy barn.

SEPTA was retiring its fleet of wood-bodied street snow sweepers they inherited from the old Philadelphia Transportation Company, and NYMT acquired C-130 in January 1975. Designed to run on Philadelphia's five-foot "broad gauge" tracks, NYMT founding director worked to convert the trucks to standard gauge. Nearly all restoration work had been completed on this project, The car has been on display since the 1980s.

Construction of the museum's demonstration railroad began in 1976, totaling nearly three-quarters of a mile by 1979, with the help of a CETA grant. By 1980, NYMT began offering rides on Fairmont "track cars" (small gas-powered vehicles once used by railway maintenance workers for transport to work sites) on the partially completed museum railroad. Around the same time, the neighboring Rochester and Genesee Valley Railroad Museum began constructing their own demonstration railroad from their Industry depot north towards NYMT, and both operations were connected in 1993. Following the joining of the NYMT and RGVRRM tracks with a golden spike ceremony, end-to-end track car operations began.

== Trolley era ==
In 1996, the body of former Northern Texas Traction Company no. 409 was acquired from the Spaghetti Warehouse restaurant when it closed earlier that year. It was moved inside the dairy barn in 1997, and opened to the public for viewing. Retaining the tables installed during its restaurant years, it is a popular destination for birthday parties. The body of New York State Railways - Rochester Lines no. 437 was acquired from a camp at Lamoka Lake in 1997. It was placed on trucks in 2003 and moved into the main barn in 2006 for evaluation and possible restoration.

The museum was able to acquire two operational former Philadelphia and Western Railroad steel interurban trolley cars from the Koekuk Junction Railway in 1996. Originally built for the Philadelphia and Western Railroad in the 1920s, cars 161 and 168 served Philadelphia's Norristown High Speed Line until retired by SEPTA in 1990. While they have no historical connection to the Rochester area, they do allow the museum to accomplish its goal of offering regular trolley rides to visitors.

In 2002, proper standard gauge Baldwin interurban trucks had been acquired from Japan and placed under Car 157, an important step towards its restoration and potential future operation on the museum railroad.

Despite having two operating trolleys in relatively good condition, the NYMT had nowhere to run them. Throughout the later half of the 1990s, volunteers from the NYMT and RGVRRM worked together to set poles and string overhead trolley contact wire along the museum railroad. Upon completion of the first quarter-mile of electrification in 2001, NYMT operated the first trolley rides for the public in the Rochester area since 1956. Following the successful weekend test runs, volunteers worked to extend the electrification nearly a full mile to the newly established Midway station in 2006. RGVRRM members designed and constructed a substation to allow regular trolley operation using power purchased and stepped down from National Grid. Regular trolley operations followed, with visitors transferring to track cars or diesel trains for the continuation to the Rochester & Genesee Valley Railroad Museum and Industry Depot.

The Pennsylvania Trolley Museum offered NYMT the body of former PTC snow sweeper C-125, which had since been converted to use as an overhead line maintenance car. The body arrived at NYMT in May 2009, and suitable standard gauge trucks were later located and placed under the body. This car is currently displayed.

In 2014, NYMT acquired former NJ Transit PPC no. 7, which had run in the Newark City Subway from 1954 until retirement in 2001. Part of a fleet originally acquired by Twin Cities Rapid Transit in 1947 and sold to New Jersey in 1954 when the Minneapolis system was converted to bus operation. The car has no historic connection to the Rochester area, but it is an important example of modern, streamlined technology employed by trolley systems across the country in the 1930s and 1940s. Currently stored out of service pending an evaluation by volunteers, restoration to operation is a future goal.

An overall future goal in conjunction with RGVRRM is to fully restore Rochester Subway car 60 to full working operation and run it on the line. An awareness and fundraising campaign for car 60 began in June 2014.

== Museum operation ==
The museum is open every Sunday between and including mid-May and the end of October, from 11:00 a.m. to 4:00 p.m. Trolley rides are offered every day that the museum is open, with few exceptions, using either car 161 or 168. All trolleys operate from NYMT to Midway station. A few weekend days each year in December are scheduled for Christmas themed train rides on the trolleys, usually utilizing car 161 as it has a recently refurbished heating system.

== Roster of equipment ==
- Rochester Transit Corporation 0243 (Rochester Railway Company 162): Built 1891 by John Stephenson Company. Rebuilt in 1918 as sand car 0243. Retired 1941, donated to Rochester Museum and Science Center. Loaned to Rail City Museum in 1956. Transferred to Magee Transportation Museum in 1965. Moved to NYMT in 1975. Partial restoration 1977–1978. On display, disassembled.
- Batavia Traction Company 33: Built 1911 for Warren Street Railway (Warren, Pa.) by Brill/Kuhlman. Sold 1924 to Batavia Traction Co. Retired 1927, body sold to private use. Acquired by NYMT in 1980, on display.
- New York State Railways Rochester Lines 437: Built 1904 by Kuhlman. Rebuilt 1917–1919 as single-ended car. Retired 1936. Body sold to Louis Barnard and moved to Lake Lamoka. Acquired by NYMT in 1997. Placed on replacement trucks in 2003. Placed in carbarn in 2006, stored.
- New York State Railways Rochester Lines 1402: Built 1904 by Kuhlman as a semi-convertible car. Rebuilt in 1920 as a single-end center-entrance trailer. Retired in 1935, sold to private use. Donated to NYMT in 2004. Stored.
- New York State Railways Rochester Lines 1406: Body acquired by NYMT in the 1970s, scrapped in the 1980s.
- Elmira, Corning and Waverly Railway 107: Built 1911 by Jewett. Retired 1930, sold intact to Louis Barnard and moved to Lake Lamoka. Purchased by William McCaleb in 1970 and moved to Magee Transportation Museum. Sold to Henry Hamlin in 1973 and moved to NYMT. Partial restoration 1974. Stripped down to body. On display.
- New York State Railways Rochester and Eastern Rapid Railway 157: Built 1914 by Niles. Retired in 1931, body sold to Msgr. Louis W. Edleman. Moved to Magee Transportation Museum in 1970. Sold to Henry Hamlin in 1973 and moved to NYMT. Partial cosmetic restoration in 1990. Trucks acquired 2002. On display.
- Philadelphia and Western Railroad 161: Built 1927 by Brill. Retired 1990. Sold to Keokuk Junction Railway. Acquired by NYMT in 1996, first operation in 2001. Cosmetic restoration completed in 2006. In regular Sunday operation since 2008.
- Philadelphia and Western Railroad 168: Built 1929 by Brill. Retired 1990. Sold to Keokuk Junction Railway. Acquired by NYMT in 1996, first operation in 2001. Currently kept as back-up car.
- Northern Texas Traction Company 409: Built 1919 by St. Louis Car Co. as a parlor trailer. Retired in 1932. Body later acquired by Spaghetti Warehouse restaurant chain, moved to Rochester. Sold at auction, donated, and moved to NYMT in 1996. On display.
- Hornell Traction Company 34: Built by Brill 1905 as a single-truck snow plow. Retired in 1926, all components stripped. Body sold to private use in Dansville, New York. Acquired by NYMT in 1998. Stored.
- Philadelphia Transportation Company C-130: Built 1923 by Brill as a double-truck snow sweeper. Retired in 1974, acquired by NYMT. Trucks converted to standard gauge. Operational. On display.
- Rochester Transit Corporation L-2: ML8 Plymouth gasoline-mechanical locomotive. Acquired in kit form by New York State Railways in 1928. Used on Rochester Subway until 1957. Sold to Atkins Waste Materials. Donated to NYMT in 1977. Partial restoration attempted. Stored.
- Genesee and Wyoming Railroad 8: Wooden caboose constructed by the Delaware, Lackawanna and Western Railroad in 1914. Sold to Genesee and Wyoming Railroad in 1934. Retired and donated to NYMT in 1977. Restored. Stored.
