= Syracuse and Onondaga Railway =

Railway in Syracuse, NY

Overview
- Headquarters: Syracuse, New York
- Locale: Syracuse, New York, United States
- Dates of operation: 1863–1890
- Successor: People's Railroad

Technical
- Track gauge: 4 ft 8 1/2 in (1,435 mm) standard gauge

The Syracuse and Onondaga Railway, a horse-drawn city railway, was chartered on April 29, 1863, and opened on July 25, 1864, in Syracuse, New York. The line commenced in Downtown Syracuse at Washington Street and terminated at Oakwood Cemetery at Brighton Avenue where it connected with the Onondaga Valley Railroad. By 1890, the total length of the road was 2 miles (3.2 km).

In late 1890, the company merged with People's Railroad and ceased to exist.
