= Daniel P. Wood =

American politician

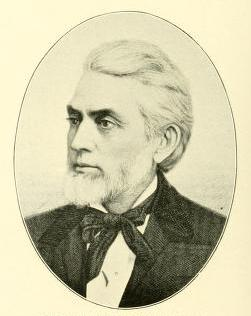
Daniel P. Wood

Daniel Phelps Wood (November 5, 1819 in Pompey, Onondaga County, New York – May 1, 1891 in Syracuse, Onondaga Co., NY) was an American lawyer and senator from New York. He became Major General of the 6th Division of the National Guard.

== Life ==
He was the son of Daniel Wood (died 1838) and Sophia (Sims) Wood. He attended Pompey Hill Academy and graduated from Hamilton College in 1843. Then he studied law with Victory Birdseye, was admitted to the bar, and commenced practice in Syracuse in 1846. On August 14, 1848, he married Lora Celeste Smith (1823–1891), and they had six children. He was for three years City Attorney of Syracuse.

He was a Whig member of the New York State Assembly (Onondaga Co., 3rd D.) in 1853 and 1854. In 1853, he was one of the Managers (prosecutors) at the impeachment trial of Canal Commissioner John C. Mather. Afterwards, he spent some time in South Carolina to improve his health.

He was a Republican member of the State Assembly in 1865, 1866 (both Onondaga Co., 2nd D.), and 1867 (Onondaga Co., 1st D.).

He was a member of the New York State Senate (22nd D.) from 1872 to 1875, sitting in the 95th, 96th, 97th and 98th New York State Legislatures. In 1874, he was appointed as Major General of the 6th Division of the National Guard.

He also engaged in the manufacture of salt, and in banking; and was a Director of the Syracuse and Geddes Railway and the Genesee and Water Street Railroad.

He died on May 1, 1891, in Syracuse, New York; and was buried at the Oakwood Cemetery there.

== Sources ==
- The New York Civil List compiled by Franklin Benjamin Hough, Stephen C. Hutchins and Edgar Albert Werner (1870; pg. 476, 478, 503, 505 and 507)
- Life Sketches of the State Officers, Senators, and Members of the Assembly of the State of New York in 1867 by S. R. Harlow & H. H. Boone (1867; pg. 398ff)
- OBITUARY NOTES; Gen. Daniel P. Wood died yesterday... in NYT on May 2, 1891

New York State Assembly
Preceded by George Stevens	New York State Assembly; Onondaga County, 3rd District; 1853–1854	Succeeded by Dudley P. Phelps
Preceded by Thomas G. Alvord	New York State Assembly; Onondaga County, 2nd District; 1865–1866	Succeeded by L. Harris Hiscock
Preceded by Luke Ranney	New York State Assembly; Onondaga County, 1st District; 1867	Succeeded by Augustus G. S. Allis
New York State Senate
Preceded by George N. Kennedy	New York State Senate; 22nd District; 1872–1875	Succeeded by Dennis McCarthy
