= Fourth Ward Railroad =

Overview
- Headquarters: Syracuse, New York
- Locale: Syracuse, New York, United States
- Dates of operation: 1888–1890
- Successor: Syracuse Consolidated Street Railway

Technical
- Track gauge: 4 ft 8 1/2 in (1,435 mm) standard gauge

The Fourth Ward Railroad, a street trolley line in Syracuse, New York, was organized in 1887 and opened in 1888. The company was one of three different railways that were awarded operation franchise rights to run cars in James Street.

The line commenced in James Street where it ran to Hawley Avenue, Green, Lodi and Willow. The tracks in East Water street were laid by the Genesee and Water Street Railroad and were acquired by the road later that year.
