= Rochester and Suburban Railway =

Railway New York

Overview
- Headquarters: Rochester, New York
- Locale: Irondequoit, New York
- Dates of operation: 1900–1909
- Predecessor: Rochester and Lake Ontario Railway; Rochester and Irondequoit Railroad
- Successor: New York State Railways

Technical
- Track gauge: 4 ft 8 1/2 in (1,435 mm)
- Electrification: 600v DC

The Rochester and Suburban Railway was a streetcar company that operated in the Rochester, New York area. The company was preceded by the Rochester and Lake Ontario Railway, which was formed in 1879 to construct a steam-powered railroad connecting Rochester at Portland Avenue with Sea Breeze on the shores of Lake Ontario. The line was operated with enclosed "dummy" steam locomotives. At the line's terminus, the railroad constructed a resort, which later became the modern Seabreeze amusement park. The railroad was leased by the Rochester and Irondequoit Railroad in 1893, which in turn built its own electric streetcar line along St. Paul Boulevard to the Summerville lakeside community in Irondequoit. The electric line only operated in the summer months, and connected to a ferry boat that transported passengers across the Genesee River to Charlotte. The opening of the Stutson Street Bridge in 1927 forced the termination of ferry service, and the railroads entered receivership soon after.

== Control by New York State Railways ==
The Rochester and Suburban Railway was chartered in 1900 and purchased the Rochester and Irondequoit Railroad at a foreclosure sale, and then merged the Rochester and Lake Ontario Railway. The former R&LO line was rebuilt and electrified and year-round service to Summerville began in 1905. That same year, the railroad was leased to the Rochester Railway Company, which in turn was acquired by New York State Railways in 1909. The Sea Breeze line was closed in 1936, and the Summerville line followed a year later.
