= Syracuse Transit Corporation =

Overview
- Headquarters: Syracuse, New York
- Dates of operation: 1939–1972
- Predecessor: Syracuse Rapid Transit Railway
- Successor: Central New York Regional Transportation Authority

The former Syracuse Lines of New York State Railways were reorganized on November 22, 1939, as the Syracuse Transit Corporation (STC). This privately owned transit company inherited 27 transit routes serving the city and suburbs of Syracuse, seven of which were streetcar lines. By 1941, all lines had been converted to bus operation. All STC transit franchises were purchased by the public Central New York Regional Transportation Authority in 1972, continuing their operation as CNY Centro.

== History ==
New York State Railways was created by the New York Central Railroad in 1909 to control several streetcar and interurban railway systems across upstate New York. The Syracuse Lines consisted of the city and suburban railways that had been previously consolidated under the Syracuse Rapid Transit Railway and came under control of New York State Railways in 1912. New York Central sold the company in 1928 and it entered receivership in 1929. The process to convert streetcar lines to bus operation began in 1933 with the Burnet line. Additional line closures followed even as New York State Railways emerged from receivership in 1934.

The Syracuse Lines were reorganized as the privately owned Syracuse Transit Corporation on November 22, 1939, with Benjamin E. Tilton as president (Tilton has been previously appointed as a trustee of the New York State Railways while it was in bankruptcy proceedings). One month before the reorganization, the University line was closed on September 30. Only seven streetcar lines remained, with the rest of the routes previously converted to bus operation. The South Salina and Nedrow lines were closed on June 29, 1940. The Elm Street line followed on November 11, 1940. The last day of streetcar operation in Syracuse was January 4, 1941, when the Walnut, Westcott, Butternut, and Wolf lines were closed. Cars 1074 and 1078 were coupled together as the final train operated for the benefit of transit officials and local politicians.

== From Private to Public ==
Bus transportation continued to be offered through the 1950s and 1960s, and new fleets of diesel buses were purchased as routes were expanded to serve the growing suburbs. The Central New York Regional Transportation Authority was created by an act of legislature in 1970 to develop, improve, and coordinate mass transit in central New York. The first member was Onondaga County, and CNY Centro was created to take over the transit franchises of the bankrupt Syracuse Transit Corporation in 1972.
