= Oneida Railway =

Interurban railway in New York

Overview
- Locale: Oneida, New York to Syracuse, New York
- Dates of operation: 1907–1930
- Successor: New York State Railways

Technical
- Track gauge: 4 ft 8 1/2 in (1,435 mm) standard gauge

The Oneida Railway, which was an interurban rail, was established in 1907 when the New York Central Railroad electrified 49 miles (79 km) of the West Shore Railroad between Syracuse, New York and Utica, New York. The interurban railroad used nontraditional third-rail pickup for power instead of the typical overhead catenary. In 1909 the system merged with the New York State Railways system which remained in business until 1930.
