= Rochester subway =

Former freight and rapid transit rail line in Rochester, New York

Rochester Industrial and Rapid Transit Railway (Rochester subway)
- Former City Hall station in 1945

Overview
- Headquarters: Rochester, New York
- Reporting mark: RSB
- Locale: City of Rochester and Brighton, New York
- Dates of operation: December 1, 1927; 98 years ago–June 30, 1956; 70 years ago
- Predecessor: Erie Canal
- Successor: Interstate 490; Interstate 590

Technical
- Track gauge: 4 ft 8 1/2 in (1,435 mm) standard gauge
- Electrification: 600v DC
- Length: About 7 miles (11 km)

The Rochester Industrial and Rapid Transit Railway (reporting mark RSB), more commonly known as the Rochester subway, was a freight and rapid transit rail line in the city of Rochester, New York that operated from 1927 to 1956. The subway was constructed in the bed of the old Erie Canal, which allowed the route to be grade-separated for its entire length. Two miles (3.2 km) of the route through downtown were constructed in a cut-and-cover tunnel that became Broad Street, and the only underground portion of the subway.

The railroad was designed to reduce interurban traffic on city streets and to facilitate freight interchange between the railroads. The line was operated on a contract basis by New York State Railways from 1927 to 1938, and by the Rochester Transit Corporation (RTC) from 1938 until its closure. Trains ran on the left, because the system included the unidirectional vehicles with doors on the right and all stations had island platforms.

The last day of passenger service was June 30, 1956. Portions of the right-of-way were used for expressway construction, while the rest was abandoned and filled in over the years. The largest remaining section is a stretch of tunnel under Broad Street from Exchange Street to the intersection of Court Street and South Avenue.

== History ==
=== Construction ===
Planning for the construction of a subway in Rochester began around 1910 as the Erie Canal was re-routed from downtown Rochester to pass south of the city. The plans were supported by a feasibility study from engineer George F. Swain and promoted by Mayor Hiram Edgerton and other civic leaders. In 1918, the new canal route was completed, and in 1919 the abandoned portion of the canal was bought by the city to serve as the route of the subway. It was believed the subway would provide several benefits to the city. In addition to providing a cross-town commute to residents in the northwest and southeast of the city, the railroad would double as a belt line connecting the five freight railroads that then ran through Rochester, which were previously disconnected. Interurban trolleys would also be routed into the subway to reduce traffic congestion on the surface streets. Construction was approved by the city council on November 22, 1921, and began in May 1922. The project had universal approval from Rochester's newspapers, chamber of commerce, and labor unions.

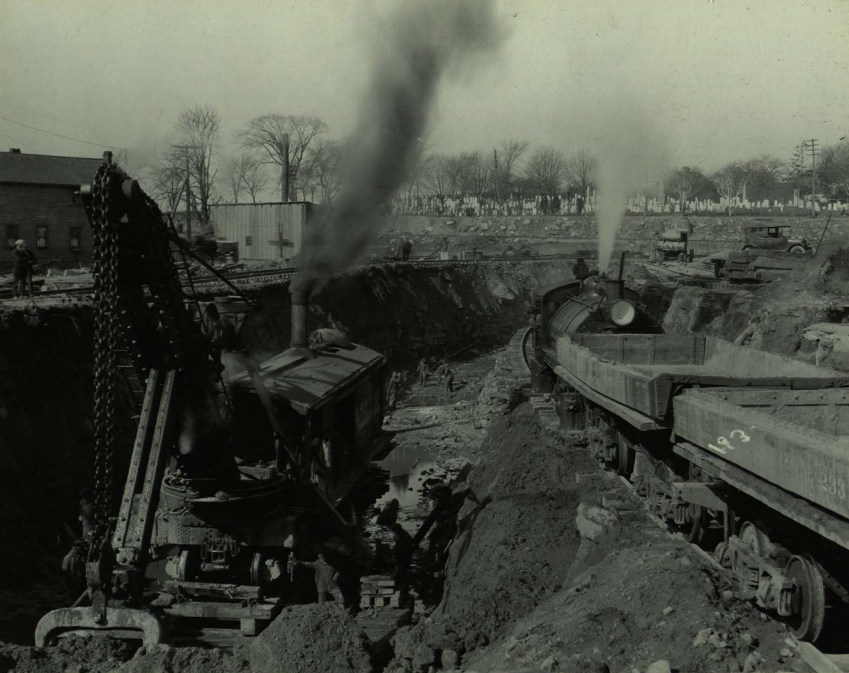
Excavation of the subway bed in 1925

In the city center, a tunnel was dug with a new street, Broad Street, located above. Only 2 miles (3.2 km) were in the tunnel, with the rest of the route in open cut. The term "subway" did not refer to the tunnel, but to the route being grade-separated and operated as rapid transit. The segment over the Genesee River utilized the former Second Genesee Aqueduct. The canal bed was widened and deepened 5 feet (1.5 m) in all directions, which required the removal of 1,000,000 cubic yards (760,000 m^{3}) of earth and dolomite. More excavation was required to accommodate the rails than anticipated, causing delays in the construction until 1927. The construction bonds would not be paid off until 1960, after the subway had closed, at a cost of over $19 million to the city.

=== New York State Railways (1927–1938) ===
Trackage map as of 1928

Operations began on December 1, 1927 under contract with New York State Railways. Ten former Utica and Mohawk Valley Railway 2000-series cars were transferred from the Utica Lines to provide dedicated service in the Rochester subway. Freight service was provided by an electric locomotive purchased from General Electric.

Interurban railways began using the new subway almost immediately, and were later joined by freight railroads. Starting on the first day of operations in 1927, the Rochester and Eastern Rapid Railway connected at Rowlands and terminated at City Hall station. The Rochester and Syracuse Railroad began using the subway in 1928, using a new connection established just east of Winton Road station. The Rochester, Lockport and Buffalo Railroad entered from the west side starting in 1928 using a ramp constructed at Lyell Avenue with this railway also terminating at City Hall station. These latter two ramps were also used by the New York Central Railroad for freight traffic. The Baltimore and Ohio Railroad connected to the subway with a ramp along Broad Street, and the Lehigh Valley Railroad connected at the Court Street Station.

In 1929, a special subway–surface operation began using a ramp at Emerson station to connect with the Dewey Avenue line to provide rush-hour service to Kodak Park, a major employer in the city. On June 1, 1929, local service on the Rochester subway was extended from Winton Road to Rowlands loop.

In the aftermath of the Great Depression, New York State Railways fell into bankruptcy along with other railroads that operated interurban lines in the area. By 1931, all of the connecting interurban railways had ceased operation leaving the subway as an east–west line with no rail connections outside the line. While the company was in receivership, New York State Railways continued to operate the subway on a contract basis with the city of Rochester. Public opinion of the subway turned negative due to low ridership.

=== Rochester Transit Corp. (1938–1956) ===
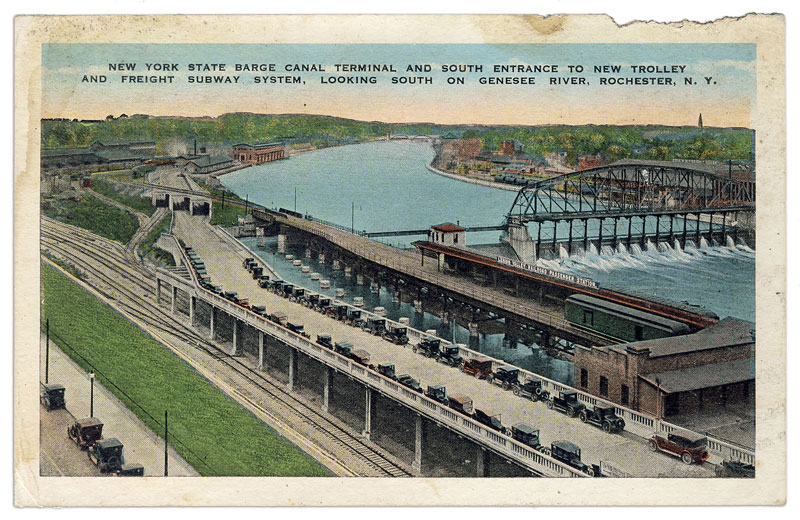
Rochester subway entrance Court Street postcard

The former Rochester Lines of New York State Railways were reorganized as the Rochester Transit Corporation on August 2, 1938, and operation of the subway was transferred to the new company. On the same day, the 2000-series cars were replaced with newer and faster 46-series steel cars acquired from the abandoned Utica & Mohawk Valley Railway in 1937. Harold S. W. MacFarlin, the city commerce commissioner, believed that the subway could be saved by faster and expanded service and promoted plans to extend the subway line.

During World War II, wartime rationing made the subway popular once again, and annual ridership peaked at over 5 million in 1946 and 1947. Proposals to extend the line were briefly considered in the press, but ridership began declining again in 1948, and the city council made plans to abandon the subway and use its route for a connecting highway to the New York State Thruway instead.

In an effort to cut costs, weekday service was reduced and Sunday service was eliminated in 1952. The service contract was awarded on a month-to-month basis until the city council voted in 1955 to end all subway service on June 30, 1956. Freight service was operated by RTC until September 1, 1957, when the remaining rail operations were turned over to the connecting New York Central (NYC) and Baltimore and Ohio (B&O) railroads.

=== Expressways and freight (1956–1996) ===
The subway bed from Court Street to Winton Road was used for the construction of a portion of the Eastern Expressway (I-490) in 1959, with the section from Winton Road to Rowlands used for I-590. Limited freight service operated by connecting railroads lasted on the western portion of the subway route from Court Street to General Motors until 1976, when the city of Rochester elected to fill the cut to eliminate maintenance on the numerous bridges. Rail freight deliveries in the subway tunnel continued until 1997, when Gannett Newspapers moved its printing operations from the Gannett Building which the subway ran under to the town of Greece.

== Rolling stock ==
=== Revenue equipment ===
- L-1 locomotive 1200V General Electric electric locomotive – 1928
- L-2 locomotive – Plymouth Locomotive Works of Plymouth, Ohio – 1937
- 46–70* Cincinnati Car Company SE Interurban Cars 1916 – all steel cars; acquired 1937
- 2000–2018* J.G. Brill SE Interurban Cars 1902 – wood cars built as trailers and converted to motors; acquired 1927

* Even numbers only.

=== Work fleet ===
- 014 Single-truck rotary plow
- 0105 Jackson & Sharp Line car
- 0200 Single-cab motor Differential flat-car
- 0205 locomotive – Jewett Car Company of Newark, Ohio – 1903
- 0214 Single-cab flat motor car
- 0220 Single-cab Differential dump car
- 0330 Differential dump car trailer
- 0331 Differential dump car trailer
- 0343 Work and tool car
- 2002 Flatcar trailer
- 2006 Flatcar trailer

== Facilities ==
- Main Street Shops (until 1941)
- General Motors Carbarn (built 1941)

== Legacy ==
=== Salvage and preservation ===
In 1976, after the announcement of the fill, the City of Rochester allowed the New York Museum of Transportation to collect the rail from the portion of the line being filled. The former rail is still in use by the museum. In 2010, when the city decided to fill the portion of the tunnel between Brown and the B&O ramp, the museum was allowed to collect the remaining rail, surviving switches and other railroad fixtures from the tunnel.

Rochester subway car 60 is at the Rochester and Genesee Valley Railroad Museum, where it has been undergoing restoration since 2016. Built in 1916 for Utica Railways and moved to Rochester in 1936, it is the only surviving example from the 12-car fleet that served the subway. Car 60 was set aside for preservation in 1956, and was donated to the Rochester Chapter of the National Railway Historical Society. The trolley car was loaned to other organizations and returned to the Rochester & Genesee Valley Railroad Museum in 1998, prior to restoration. Locomotive L-2 was rescued from a Rochester scrap yard in the 1970s, and has been set aside for a potential future restoration by the New York Museum of Transportation.

=== Future of the tunnel ===
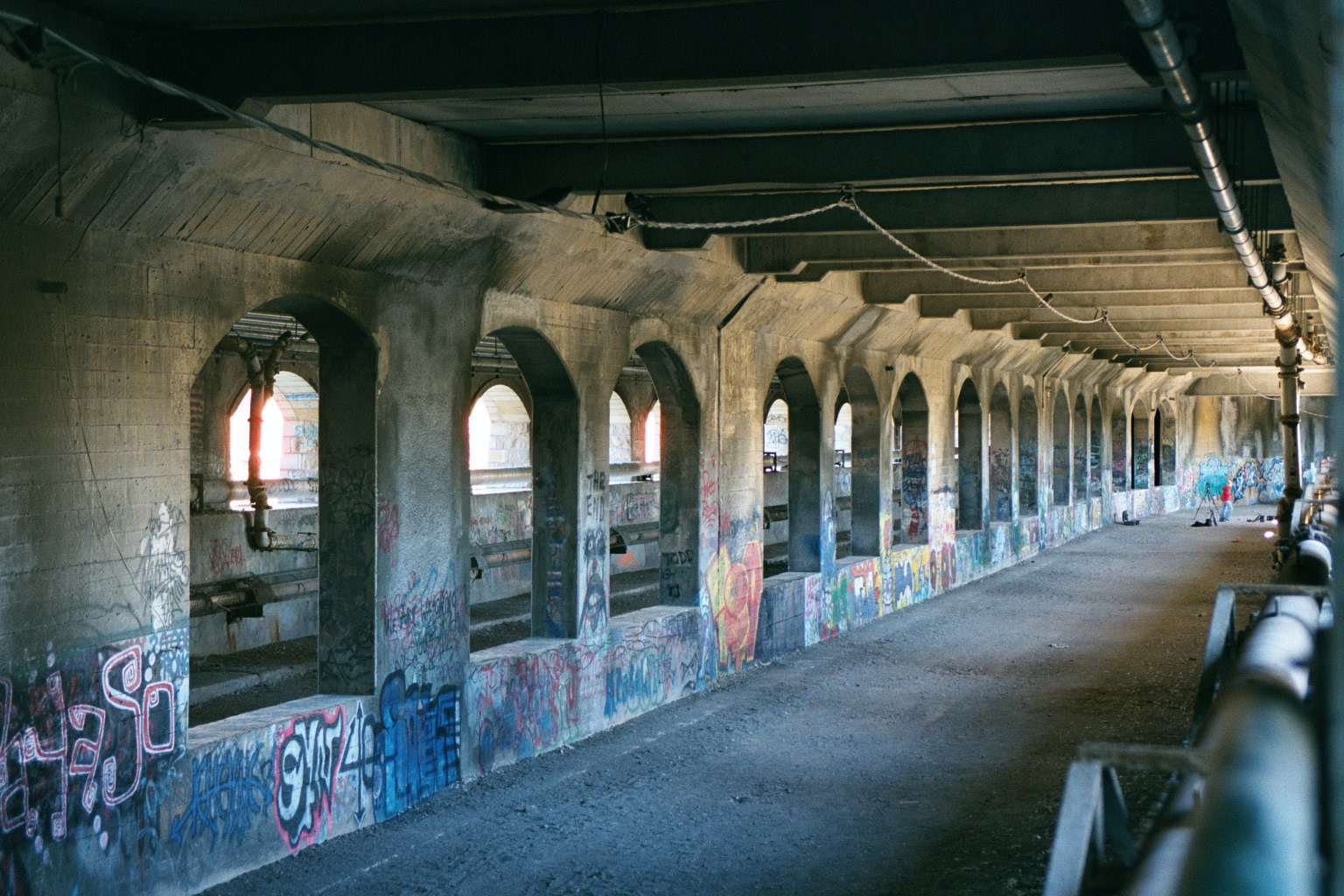
Former subway bed under Broad Street

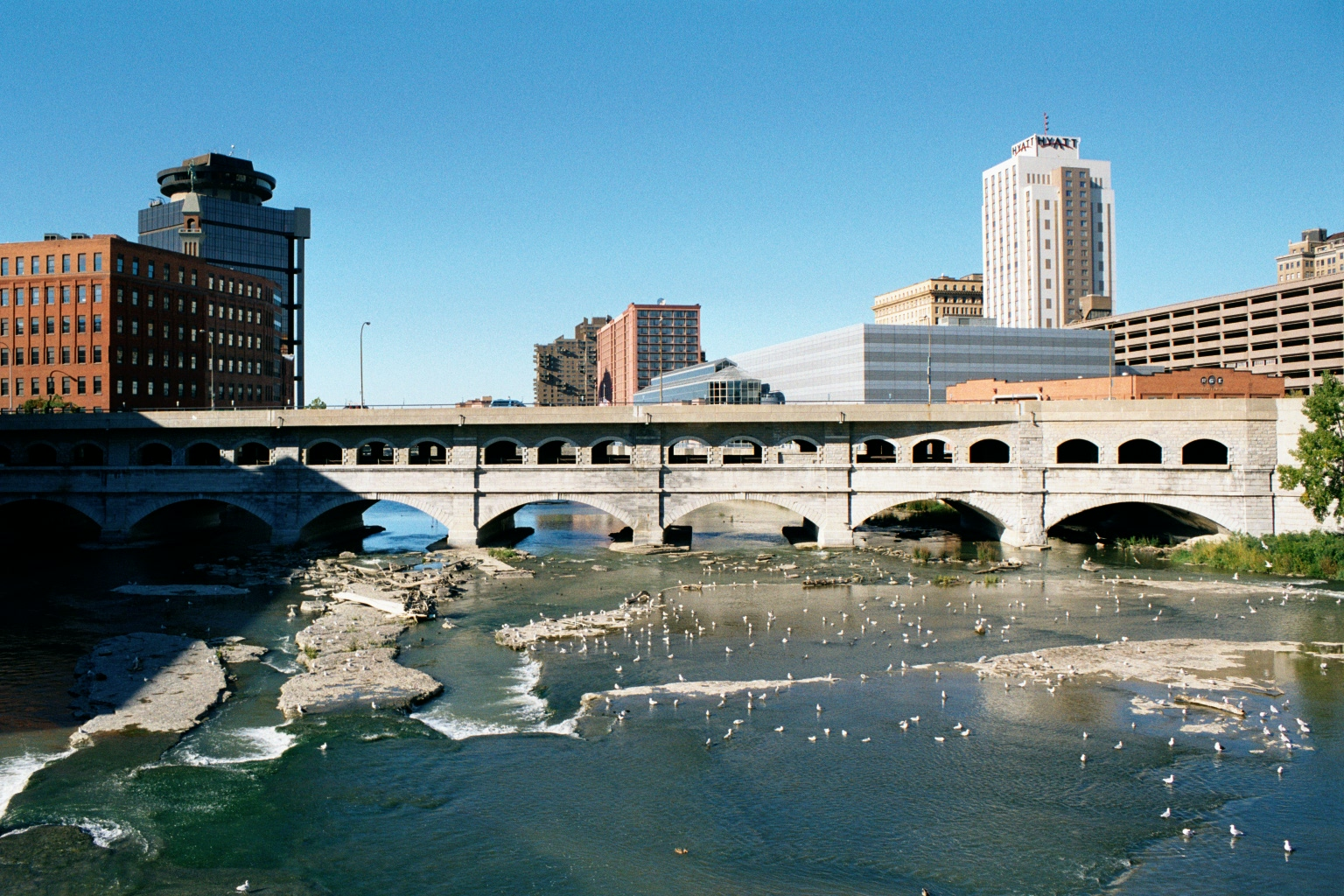
The Broad Street Bridge in 2002

The property of the abandoned subway tunnel belongs to the city of Rochester. In recent decades, city officials have considered several plans to fill or renovate the tunnel. While it remains abandoned, the tunnel has become a refuge for the homeless, a destination for urban explorers, and a canvas for local graffiti artists.

In 2004, Rochester city officials decided to fill the remaining subway tunnel with earth, as maintenance of the tunnel was costing the city US$1,200,000 annually. This decision caused public outcry, since residents regard the subway as part of their history. The Subway-Erie Canal Revitalization Group was formed in opposition to the city's plans, and advocated for constructing a new trolley line in the city using the tunnel.

Other proposals were made for repurposing the tunnel instead of filling it in, such as removing Broad Street and restoring the old canal or constructing an underground retail center. One includes converting the Broad Street bridge tunnel—the former canal aqueduct—into an enhanced pedestrian corridor, which would also include a Rochester Transportation Museum, and a tram system.

In 2008, the city decided to fill in the western end off the tunnel under Broad Street. Construction took place in 2010 at a cost of US$17,500,000. The city rebuilt the former B&O ramp into what remains of the subway, making that ramp the western access point into the subway.

In 2009, the city released a proposal for the remaining section of the tunnel under Broad Street. The plan involved removing the street surface and refilling the canal bed with water. It was endorsed by the Canal Society of New York and remained under consideration through 2011, although it did not attract the necessary funds.

In 2018, a plan dubbed ROC the Riverway was unveiled that proposes removing the Broad Street level of the aqueduct and partially re-flooding the former canal and subway bed on the aqueduct with water similar to what was done with the historic canals at Canalside in Buffalo, NY and incorporate walkways to connect the nearby Blue Cross Arena with the nearby convention center. The project moved to the planning and construction phase in 2022. Also in 2018, the city solicited bids to turn a remaining segment of tunnel between Main Street and Exchange Street into underground parking. There were no interested buyers.

== Gallery ==
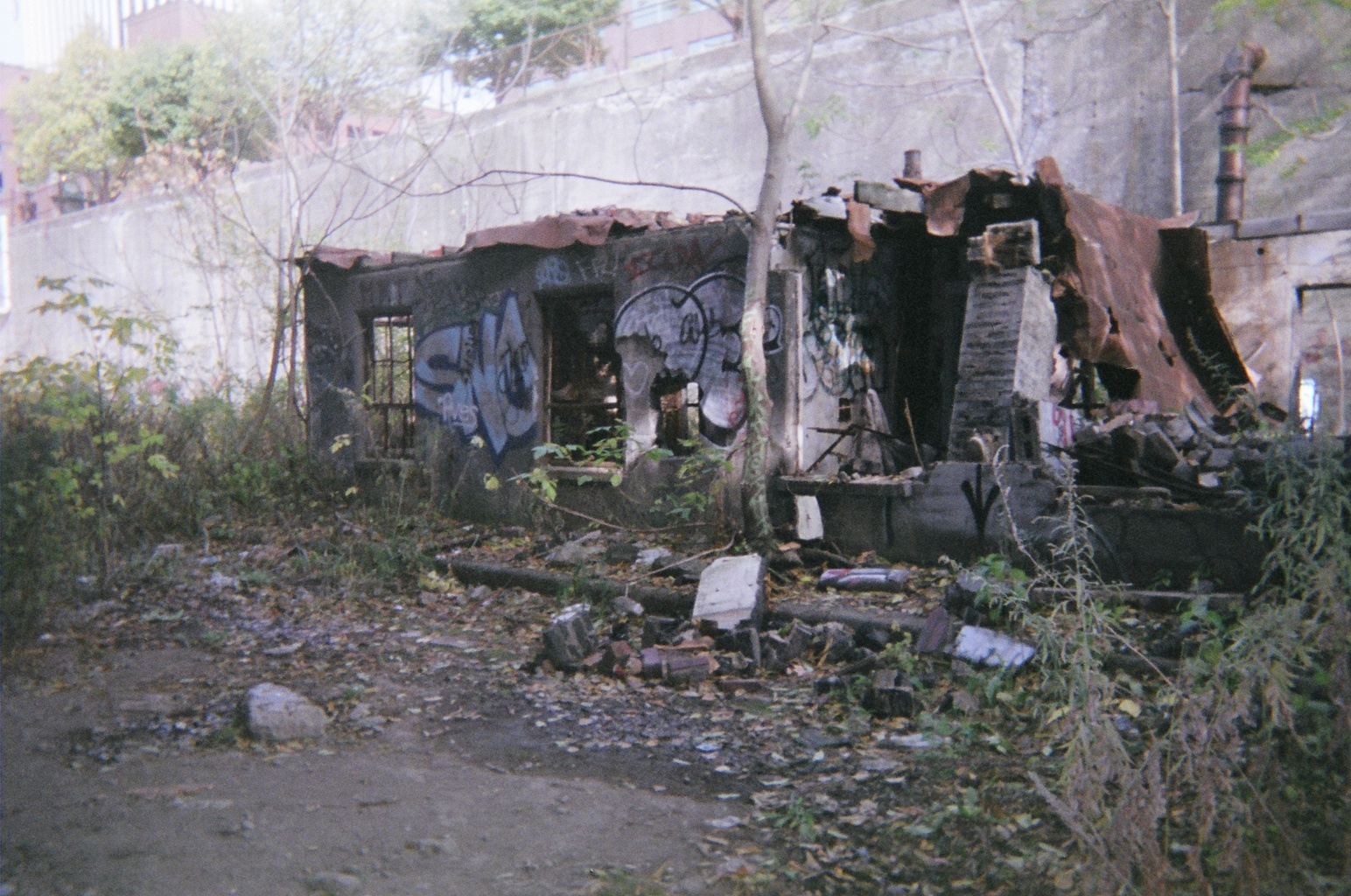
Court Street station, 2007

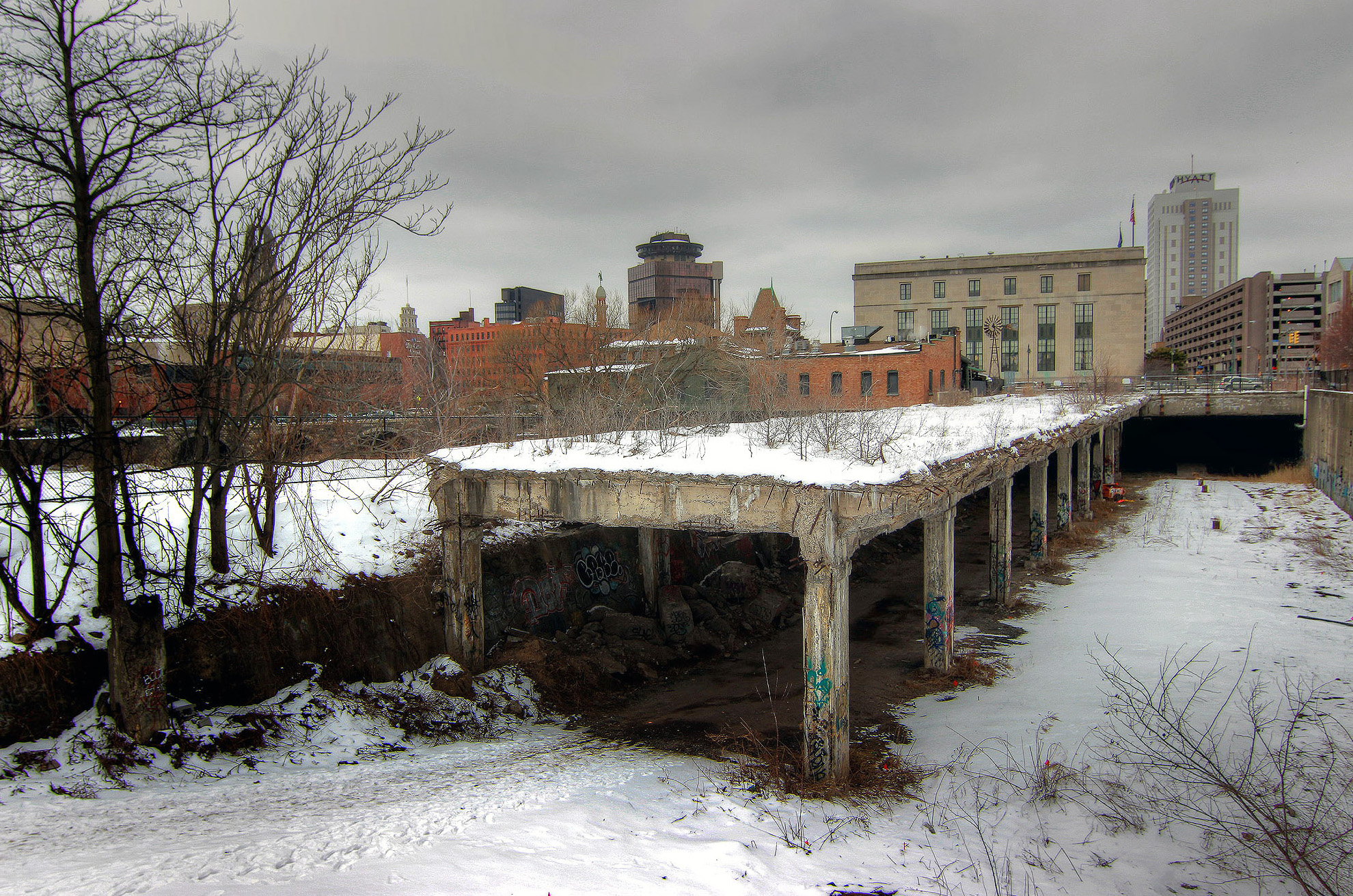
View of the Court Street station, 2013

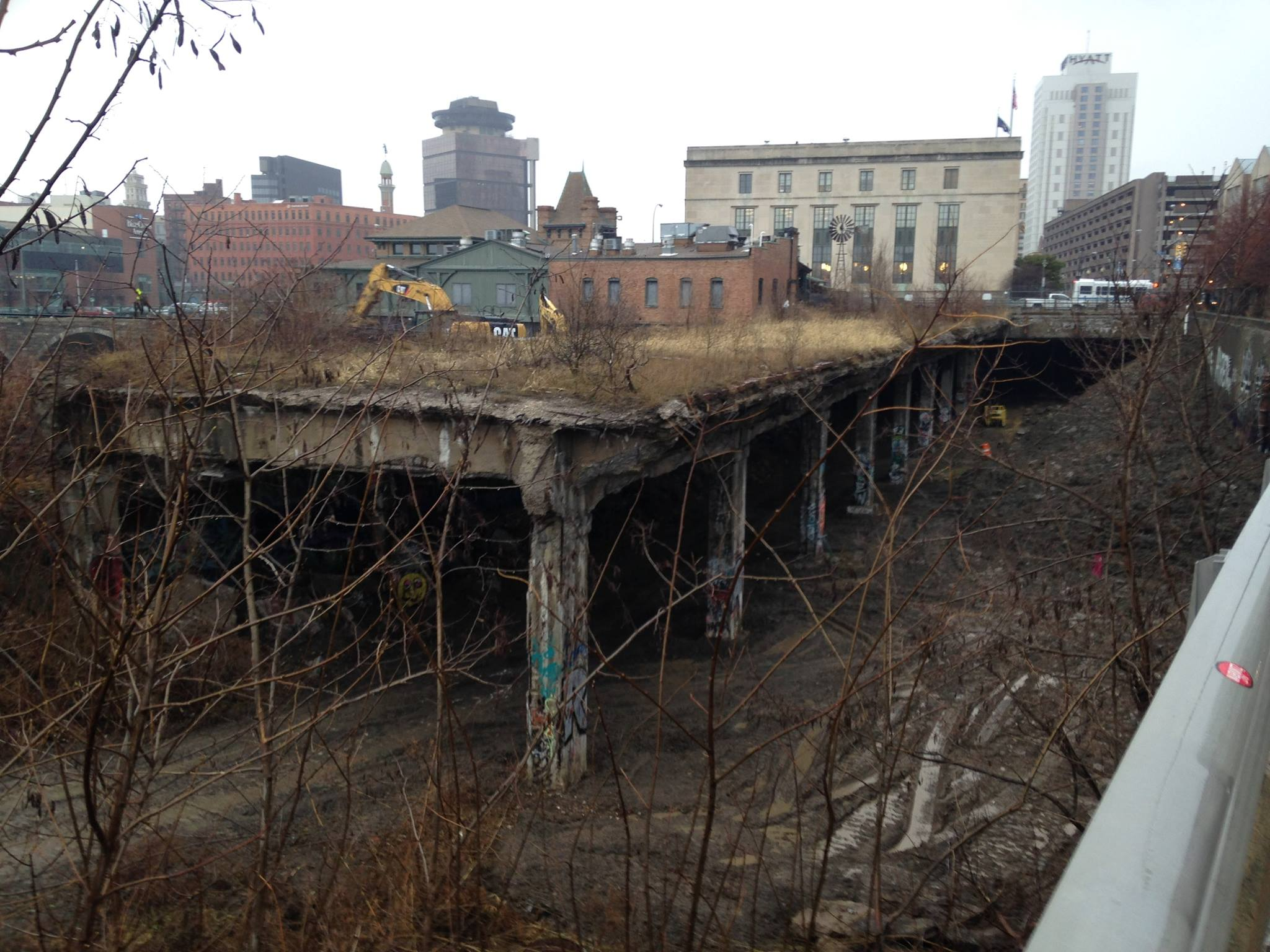
East end being filled in, January 2017

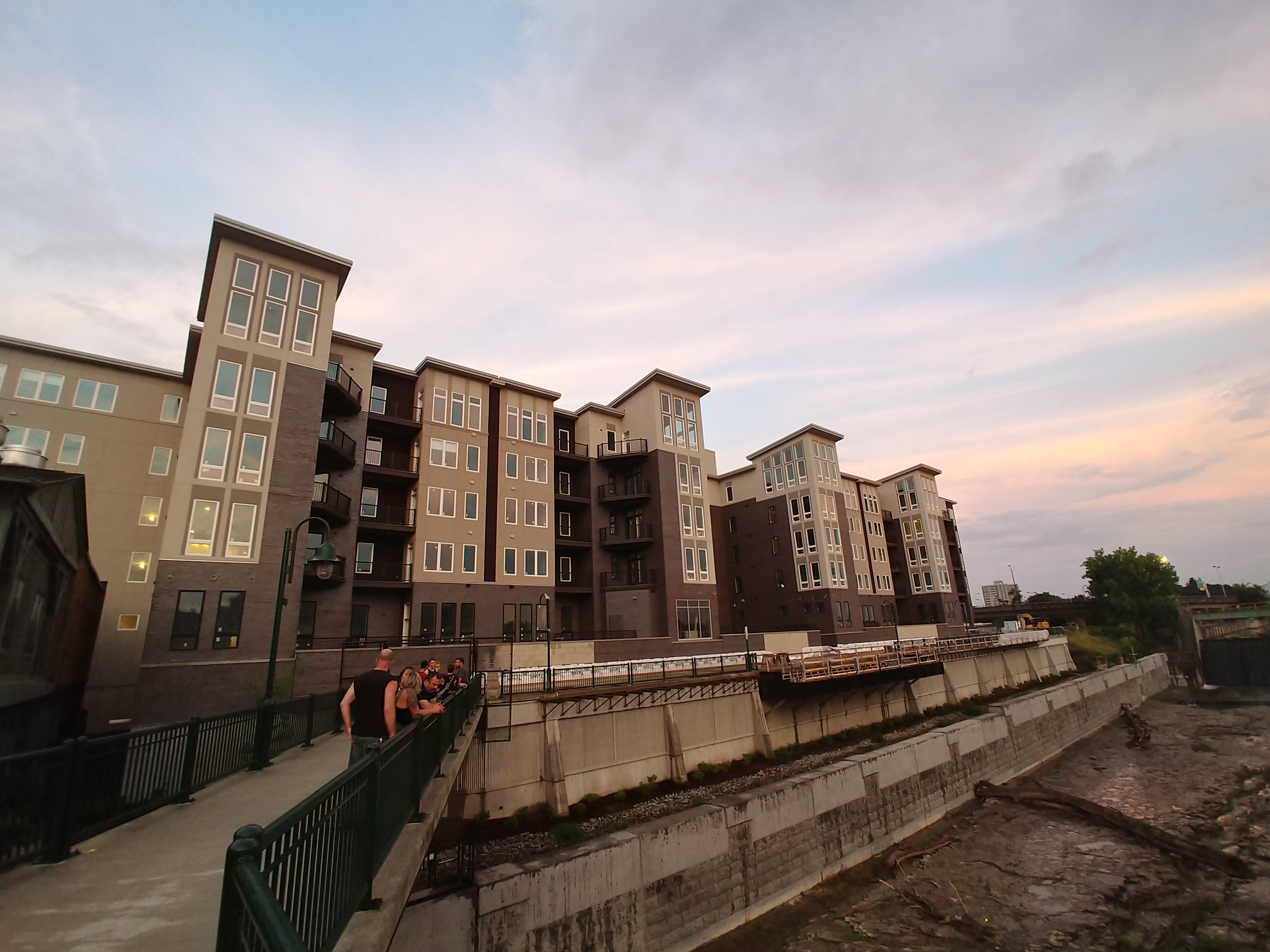
mixed-use commercial and luxury residential low-rise erected on the site, July 2018

== See also ==
- Cincinnati Subway
- Detroit-Superior underground subway in Cleveland
