= Syracuse Consolidated Street Railway =

Overview
- Headquarters: Syracuse, New York
- Locale: Syracuse, New York
- Dates of operation: 1890–1896
- Successor: Syracuse Rapid Transit Railway

Technical
- Track gauge: 4 ft 8 1/2 in (1,435 mm) standard gauge

The Syracuse Consolidated Street Railway, chartered on May 22, 1890, in Syracuse, New York. On July 1, 1890, the company leased, in perpetuity, several street railroads in the city including Third Ward Railway, Fourth Ward Railroad, Fifth Ward Railroad, Seventh Ward Railroad, Eleventh Ward Railroad, Genesee and Water Street Railroad, Woodlawn and Butternut Street Railway, Syracuse and Geddes Railway and New Brighton and Onondaga Valley Railroad. The rail ran a total distance of 24 miles (39 km) and had branches every 3 miles (4.8 km).

The company filed for bankruptcy in 1893 and merged with the Syracuse Rapid Transit Railway Company in May 1896.
