= Woodlawn and Butternut Street Railway =

Overview
- Headquarters: Syracuse, New York
- Locale: Syracuse, New York, United States
- Dates of operation: 1886–1890
- Successor: Syracuse Consolidated Street Railway

Technical
- Track gauge: 4 ft 8 1/2 in (1,435 mm) standard gauge

The Woodlawn and Butternut Street Railway, a horse-drawn street trolley line in Syracuse, New York, was established in 1886. The road commenced at North Salina Street at the junction of James Street and traveled to Butternut street and Manlius Street with final destination, Woodlawn Cemetery.

The company merged with Syracuse Consolidated Street Railway in 1890, after an agreement was made that allowed the new company to lease the lines.
