= Rochester Transit Corporation =

Overview
- Main region(s): Rochester, New York
- Fleet: Bus, rail routes
- Reporting mark: RSB (Rochester Subway)
- Dates of operation: 1938–1968
- Predecessors: Rochester Railway Company; New York State Railways
- Successor: Rochester-Genesee Regional Transportation Authority

Technical
- Electrification: 600 V Rochester Subway (1938-1957)

Rochester Transit Corporation (RTC) was a privately owned, for-profit transit company that operated streetcar, rail, and bus transit in the city of Rochester and surrounding suburban areas from 1938 until 1968. The city-owned Rochester Subway was operated by RTC on a contract basis from 1938 until 1957. John F. Uffert and William A. Lang served as presidents during the course of operation.

== History ==
The majority of streetcar and bus transit lines in Rochester were operated by the Rochester Railway Company, which was acquired by the New York State Railways in 1905. When New York State Railways entered receivership in 1929, stockholders campaigned to maintain their investment and reorganize Rochester Railway Company. A committee of investors led by attorney Howard M. Woods proposed a reorganization that would return the company to local control. After several years of negotiation, the plan was approved by the Public Service Commission in 1937.

== Rail to bus conversion ==
The new Rochester Transit Corporation assumed operation of the old Rochester Lines of the New York State Railways on August 2, 1938. The Genesee Street line was closed on March 28, 1939, with the Lyell Avenue route following on April 23. Four more lines closed on May 23, including South Avenue, St. Paul, Seneca Park, and Summerville. In an effort to eliminate the costly rail transit lines, the company quickly put together a plan to replace the remaining streetcars with bus operation.

Bus/Trolley routes

- 1 Lake/Park
- 2 Thurston/Parsells
- 3 Lyell/Bay
- 4 Genesee/University
- 5 St.Paul/South
- 6 Jefferson/Webster
- 7 Monroe/N. Clinton
- 8 E.Main/Chili
- 9 Hudson/Mt. Read
- 10 Dewey/Portland
- 11 Joseph/S.Clinton
- 12 Goodman/West
- 13 Culver
- 14 Ridge
- 15 Norton/Britton
- 16 Emerson
- 17 East Avenue
- 19 S. Plymouth/Clifford
- 23 Titus
- 25 Subway

Following approval by the Public Service Commission in 1940, RTC carried out its plan to replace all trolleys with buses. The Thurston and Parsells routes were closed on December 24, 1940. On February 18, 1941, the Monroe Avenue and North Clinton lines were shut down. The Portland and Dewey lines followed a month later on March 11. The last day for streetcar service in Rochester was March 31 when the Main East and Lake Avenue lines were closed. The only rail operation which remained was the Rochester Subway, which was operated by RTC on a contract basis with the city.

== Postwar era ==
In 1943 the board of directors rallied support to buy out the remainder of shares to put RTC back in local control. General manager John F. Uffert was elected president and kept the system running through the difficult war years. Postwar prosperity would bring labor unrest, and transit workers walked out in May 1952 in a disagreement over wages. After 23 days, the matter was sent to arbitration and operations resumed. Unfortunately, this incident would set the tone for labor relations throughout the rest of the company's history.

Ridership on the Rochester Subway sharply declined through the end of the 1940s, and RTC requested additional subsidy to continue operation. A new contract signed in 1951 eliminated all subsidy from the city in exchange for all subway passenger and freight revenues going directly to RTC. Losses continued to mount, and in 1952 Sunday and holiday service was eliminated. The city council voted in 1954 to end all subway service at the end of 1955 so the Subway roadbed could be offered to the state as a route for a new expressway connecting to the New York State Thruway at Victor. The Subway was operated on a month-to-month contract through 1955. With New York State committed to building the Eastern Expressway, the city council set June 30, 1956, as the last day of passenger operation. Rochester Transit continued to operate freight trains in the Subway until that responsibility was passed on to the connecting railroads at the end of August 1957.

The acquisition of new buses, the opening of the Eastern Expressway, and the adoption of a one-way street plan for downtown to alleviate congestion helped grow ridership in the 1960s. While stockholders were pleased on the return on their investment, transit workers remained unhappy. A two-day strike in 1965 helped gain some modest increases for workers, but unrest continued. A dispute over job listings and seniority led to a sudden walkout in May 1967. An agreement was reached after only a week, however contract renewal negotiations were on the horizon. Both sides broke down and transit workers once again went on strike on November 30.

== From private to public ==
When workers walked out on November 30, 1968, it set into motion a series of events that would bring about the end of the privately owned transit company. Due to the extreme bitterness and distrust on both sides, the strike dragged on through the holiday season. The city appealed to the union and to RTC for resolution with little effect. As a last resort, the city council drew up plans for the condemnation and purchase of the transit lines from RTC. The union agreed to the city's terms and the strike was broken on January 25, 1969. Above the objections of RTC president William Lang, the city of Rochester selected National City Management Company of Houston, Texas, to operate the transit system. The new Rochester Transit Service began operations on May 23. Later that year, the RTS bus operations were acquired by the new Rochester-Genesee Regional Transportation Authority.

== Preserved equipment ==
The New York Museum of Transportation (NYMT) is home to several pieces of equipment once operated by Rochester Transit Corp. RTC L-2, a Plymouth ML8 locomotive used to switch non-electrified freight customers. Disassembled and awaiting future restoration. RTC "Casey Jones" Inspection Car, fully restored and operated on occasion for special events. RTC 233, a General Motors model TDH 5304 diesel bus is also in the collection of NYMT. The only surviving "Peter Witt" street car, RTC 1213, is currently residing at the Seashore Trolley Museum undergoing a multi-year restoration. Rochester Subway Car 60 (RTC 60) is currently partially disassembled at the Rochester and Genesee Valley Railroad Museum and is undergoing an active restoration.
