= New York State Railways =

Overview
- Locale: Upstate New York
- Dates of operation: 1909–1948
- Successor: Rochester Transit Corporation (Rochester); Syracuse Transit Corporation (Syracuse); Utica Transit Corporation (Utica)

Technical
- Track gauge: 4 ft 8 1/2 in (1,435 mm) standard gauge

New York State Railways was a subsidiary of the New York Central Railroad that controlled several large city streetcar and electric interurban systems in upstate New York. It included the city transit lines in Rochester, Syracuse, Utica, Oneida and Rome, plus various interurban lines connecting those cities. New York State Railways also held a 50% interest in the Schenectady Railway Company, but it remained a separate independent operation. The New York Central took control of the Rochester Railway Company, the Rochester and Eastern Rapid Railway and the Rochester and Sodus Bay Railway in 1905, and the Mohawk Valley Company was formed by the railroad to manage these new acquisitions. New York State Railways was formed in 1909 when the properties controlled by the Mohawk Valley Company were merged. In 1912 it added the Rochester and Suburban Railway, the Syracuse Rapid Transit Railway, the Oneida Railway, and the Utica and Mohawk Valley Railway. The New York Central Railroad was interested in acquiring these lines in an effort to control the competition and to gain control of the lucrative electric utility companies that were behind many of these streetcar and interurban railways. Ridership across the system dropped through the 1920s as operating costs continued to rise, coupled with competition from better highways and private automobile use. New York Central sold New York State Railways in 1928 to a consortium led by investor E. L. Phillips, who was looking to gain control of the upstate utilities. Phillips sold his stake to Associated Gas & Electric in 1929, and the new owners allowed the railway bonds to default. New York State Railways entered receivership on December 30, 1929. The company emerged from receivership in 1934, and local operations were sold off to new private operators between 1938 and 1948.

== Early history (1905–1928) ==
New York State Railways stock certificate engraving

The New York Central Railroad took notice to the potential competition arising from the streetcar and electric interurban railways being built in its territory across upstate New York. In an effort to control the competition, the railroad began buying controlling interests in the Rochester Railway Company, the Rochester and Sodus Bay Railway, and the Rochester and Eastern Rapid Railway. The Mohawk Valley Company was formed in 1905 to manage these properties. The company also controlled the Canandaigua Gas Light Company, the Despatch Heat, Light and Power Company, and the Eastern Monroe Electric Light and Power Company. New York State Railways was incorporated on March 22, 1909, to take over the three railways and consolidate them into a single entity.

A second wave of expansion followed when the Utica and Mohawk Valley Railway, the Oneida Railway, the Syracuse Rapid Transit Railway, and the Rochester and Suburban Railway were merged into New York State Railways on October 31, 1912. The East Side Traction Company was added on August 28, 1919.

At its peak, New York State Railways operated 338 miles across Rochester, Syracuse, Utica, Oneida, Sodus Bay, Canandaigua, and Geneva. In June 1920, the total value of the New York State Railway Corporation franchise in Syracuse as determined by the New York State Tax Commission was $2,320,000 down from $2,407,000 in 1919.

Logo used by New York State Railways displayed on the flanks of trolleys and other equipment.

Patronage on the streetcar and interurban lines declined in the 1920s, thanks to autos, buses, and paved roads — but the electric utilities owned by the company grew. As a result, in 1928 the New York Central sold its control of the New York State Railways system to what became the Associated Gas & Electric Co.

== Decline, receivership and reorganization (1929–1948) ==
Shortly after the transaction, the stock market crashed, and on December 30, 1929, the company was put into receivership. Increased competition from private automobile ownership and the construction of better highways forced the closure of the electric interurban railways. An application was made to abandon the Rochester and Eastern Rapid Railway in November 1929, but the court process was delayed until the following summer when an order was approved to end all service to Geneva on July 31, 1930.

New York State Railways emerged from receivership in 1934, and gradually the remaining core city lines were sold as separate operations. The Rochester Lines were reorganized as the Rochester Transit Corporation on August 2, 1938. The Syracuse Transit Corporation took over the former Syracuse Lines on November 22, 1939. The last streetcars operated on the Utica Lines on May 12, 1941, but it wasn't until May 1, 1948 that the transit system was reorganized as the Utica Transit Corporation.

=== Rochester Lines ===
The Rochester Lines were made up of the city and suburban lines operated by Rochester Railway Company, the Canandaigua local service (the former Canandaigua Street Railroad), the Rochester and Eastern Rapid Railway, and the Rochester and Sodus Bay Railway that were consolidated into New York State Railways in 1909. In 1927, the city-owned Rochester Subway was placed under the operation of New York State Railways on a contract basis with the city of Rochester. Trackless trolleys were briefly operated in Rochester between 1923 and 1932. The first streetcar lines were closed in 1929, including the Exchange, Plymouth, Emerson, and Driving Park routes. Service on the Rochester and Sodus Bay interurban to Sodus Bay was also abandoned the same year, local service to Glen Haven ended in 1933. The Rochester and Eastern Rapid Railway shut down its interurban line to Geneva in 1930, the same day local service ended in Canandaigua. The largest streetcar line conversion came in August 1936, when eleven routes (Durand-Eastman Park, Allen, Jefferson, South Clinton, Webster, Clifford, Central Park, Goodman North, Sea Breeze, Hudson, and Joseph) were closed. The following year the Park, West, and University lines were closed. The Rochester Lines were reorganized as Rochester Transit Corporation on August 2, 1938, to operate the remaining bus and streetcar transit lines. Streetcar operation ended in 1941, and the Rochester Subway shut down in 1956. All transit franchises succeeded by Rochester Transit Corporation in 1938 were later transferred to Rochester-Genesee Regional Transportation Authority in 1969.

=== Syracuse Lines ===
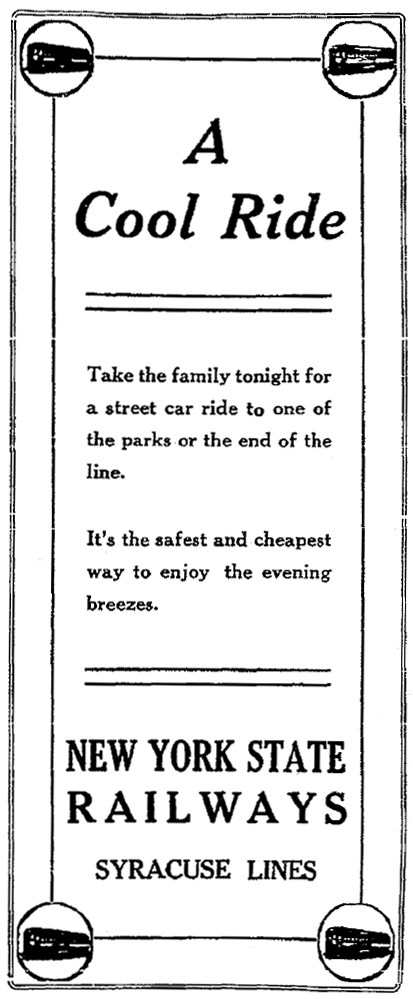
New York State Railways - A cool ride in June 1923

The Syracuse Lines consisted mainly of the city and suburban operations serving Syracuse. Several smaller streetcar and interurban lines serving the city and suburbs of Syracuse were consolidated into the Syracuse Rapid Transit Railway on May 21, 1896. Additional lines were acquired and extended throughout the 1890s. The Syracuse Rapid Transit Railway was merged with New York State Railways in 1912. At its peak, the Syracuse Lines operated more than 200 cars on 100 miles of track over 27 routes. The first streetcar line closure was the Green Street route in September 1927, with no replacement bus service. On May 31, 1930, the Valley via Elmwood and Valley via Salina routes were closed and not replaced with buses. The Burnet line was converted to bus operation On January 22, 1933. The West Genesee and West Solvay lines were closed on June 30, 1933. Additional closures followed on October 31 when the Dudley, Oak, and Park lines were shut down. The Liverpool line succumbed on the last day of 1933. The Oakwood and Summit lines were closed on May 27, 1935, and the Solvay line was the only closure in 1936. The Elmwood, East Syracuse, and Midler lines were shut down on September 15, 1937, with the Minoa route following on October 11. The Court and Midland lines closed on July 31, 1938. The final route closure under New York State Railways would be the University Line on September 30, 1939. The former Syracuse Lines were reorganized as the privately owned Syracuse Transit Corporation on November 22, 1939. All remaining streetcar lines were converted to bus by 1941. In 1972, all transit franchises were succeeded by the Central New York Regional Transportation Authority.

=== Oneida Lines ===
The Oneida Lines consisted of the city streetcar lines, the Oneida Railway interurban line between Syracuse and Utica (known as the "Third Rail Line"), and the Sherrill-Kenwood shuttle. The earliest portion of the Oneida Lines was incorporated in 1885 as the Oneida Railway Company of Oneida, New York (later simplified to Onedia Railway Company in 1903). Opened on July 4, 1885, as a horsecar transit operation, the line stretched 1.5 miles along Main Street from the New York Central Railroad station to the West Shore Railroad station at Oneida Castle. The horsecar operation ended on July 30, 1902, and the railway was shut down while the system was electrified and expanded. When it reopened on December 14, the operation was now 4.4 miles and included an extension to Wampsville.

In 1905, the Oneida Railway leased a section of the West Shore Railroad from the New York Central Railroad for the purpose of electrifying the line for interurban service between Syracuse and Utica. A connection with the Utica street railways was made at Genesee Street, and with the Syracuse street railways near Burnet Avenue. Service began on June 16, 1907. Cars were powered by a third rail, except when running on the street railways of Syracuse, Oneida, or Utica, where the overhead trolley wire was used instead.

A 1.5 mile spur was constructed from the Oneida Railway station at Sherrill to Kenwood in 1909, and operated as a single-car shuttle meeting all interurban trains. In 1911, an extension of the city streetcar was built to serve the New York, Ontario and Western Railway station at Oneida. In 1912, the Oneida operations were acquired by New York State Railways.

Declining ridership through the 1920s forced the Sherrill-Kenwood shuttle to suspend operations on August 29, 1927. The shuttle was formally abandoned nearly a year later on July 31, 1928. Ridership on the Oneida Railway declined through the 1920s and the company entered receivership. The last day of service was December 31, 1930. The electrification was removed and control of the line reverted to the West Shore Railroad. Local service on the Oneida street railway ended the same day. There was no immediate successor to the transit franchises of the Oneida Lines once all streetcar and interurban railway operations ceased at the end of 1930. The Central New York Regional Transportation Authority is now responsible for bus transportation in the region formerly served by the Oneida Lines.

=== Utica Lines ===
The Utica Lines of New York State Railways was composed mainly of the city and suburban lines serving both Utica and Rome. The various streetcar lines serving Utica were consolidated into the Utica and Mohawk Valley Railway in 1901. The Mohawk Valley Line was an interurban connecting Rome, Utica, and Little Falls, constructed between 1902 and 1903. This became the busiest route, with half-hourly service on its double-track main line. The Rome City Street Railroad was merged into the Utica and Mohawk Valley Railway in 1907. The U&MV was merged into New York State Railways in 1912. The first lines to be closed were the Auburn Avenue and Oneida Street routes in 1925. That same year an amusement park was built near the main car barn and shops called Forest Park, which was an immediate success, yet first to feel the effects of the Great Depression, which forced it to close in 1929. The South Woods shuttle also ended service in 1929. The Mohawk Valley Line began to show significant losses starting in 1926, and shut down on June 30, 1933. The steel interurban cars that served on the Mohawk Valley Line were purchased new in 1916, and were the newest equipment on the entire New York State Railways system. The cars were transferred to Rochester Lines in 1936 to upgrade the Rochester Subway, and entered service in 1938 under new operator Rochester Transit Corporation.

The Rome city lines were never successful, and the first service suspensions came to the James Street line in 1927 and the Madison Street line in 1928. All streetcar service in Rome came to an end on December 7, 1930. In 1931, the North Utica line was closed, and the Eagle Street (6) line followed in 1932. The Lenox (15), Lincoln (10), and Blandina (9) routes closed in 1933, with South Street and Mohawk street following the year after. In 1934 the South Street and Mohawk Street lines were closed, the same year New York State Railways emerged from receivership. The James Street and Clinton lines were shut down in 1936, while the Whitesboro (11) and New York Mills (12) lines were closed in the summer of 1938. The Capron (5) line hung on until April 8, 1941. The last day for streetcar operation in Utica was May 12, 1941, when the New Hartford and Forest Park (16) lines closed. The mayor of Utica was at the controls of Car 310, the last car to roll into the Forest Park car barn.

The transit franchises formerly operated by the streetcars were continued by the Copper City Bus Line and the Rome City Bus Line. It wasn't until 1948 that many parts of the former Utica Lines were reorganized as the Utica Transit Corporation. The city-owned Utica Transit Commission took over operations in 1965, which was succeeded by the Utica Transit Authority in 1974. In 2005, the transit operations transferred to the Central New York Regional Transportation Authority and its subsidiaries Centro Rome and Centro Utica.

== Bibliography ==
- King, Shelden S. (1975). The New York State Railways. Elmira, New York: Whitehall Mail Service.
