= Fifth Ward Railroad =

Railway line in New York

Overview
- Headquarters: Syracuse, New York
- Locale: Syracuse, New York, United States
- Dates of operation: 1867–1890
- Successor: Syracuse Consolidated Street Railway

Technical
- Track gauge: 4 ft 8 1/2 in (1,435 mm) standard gauge

The Fifth Ward Railroad was a horse-drawn street trolley line in Syracuse, New York, and was originally approved for construction by New York State in 1850; however, the rail was not chartered until 1867 and finally opened for business in 1868. The company merged with Syracuse Consolidated Street Railway in 1890, after an agreement was made that allowed the new company to lease the lines.

The city railway extended from Railroad Street through Clinton, Walton, West, Gifford, Geddes and returning in a loop through Delaware, Holland and Niagara to Gifford Street, a total distance of 3.48 miles (5.60 km) in the city's Near Westside. By 1875, the road extended from Washington Street to South Street and Geddes Street.
