= Seventh Ward Railroad =

Overview
- Headquarters: Syracuse, New York
- Locale: Syracuse, New York, United States
- Dates of operation: 1886–1890
- Successor: Syracuse Consolidated Street Railway

Technical
- Track gauge: 4 ft 8 1/2 in (1,435 mm) standard gauge

The Seventh Ward Railroad, a street trolley line in Syracuse, New York, was established in 1886 and held the city railway franchise rights to East Fayette Street. The total length of the road was 3 miles (4.8 km). The route followed Fayette Street from Salina Street to Montgomery Street, Jefferson, Grape, Kennedy, Renwick Avenue with final destination Oakwood Cemetery.
