= Eleventh Ward Railroad =

Street trolley line

Overview
- Headquarters: Syracuse, New York
- Locale: Syracuse, New York, United States
- Dates of operation: 1889–1890
- Successor: Syracuse Consolidated Street Railway

Technical
- Track gauge: 4 ft 8 1/2 in (1,435 mm) standard gauge

The Eleventh Ward Railroad, a street trolley line in Syracuse, New York, was established in 1889 and held the city railway franchise rights to East Fayette Street. The line followed East Fayette Street to Montgomery Street and from there through Burt, Cortland Avenue, Midland Avenue, Colvin Street, Mulberry, Elizabeth, Baker Avenue and terminating on Kennedy street.
