= Third Ward Railway =

Overview
- Headquarters: Syracuse, New York
- Locale: Syracuse, New York, United States
- Dates of operation: 1886–1890
- Successor: Syracuse Consolidated Street Railway

Technical
- Track gauge: 4 ft 8 1/2 in (1,435 mm) standard gauge

The Third Ward Railway, an electric street trolley line in Syracuse, New York, was established in 1886 and ran a distance of 4 miles (6.4 km) commencing in Park Avenue and terminating at Solvay Process Company in Solvay, a suburb. A second extension was open for business on July 4, 1889, when a branch was added from West Genesee Street to the shore of Onondaga Lake, known as "lake shore."

The company merged with Syracuse Consolidated Street Railway in 1890, after an agreement was made that allowed the new company to lease the lines.
