= New Brighton and Onondaga Valley Railroad =

Streetcar company in New York

Overview
- Headquarters: Syracuse, New York
- Locale: Syracuse, New York, United States
- Dates of operation: 1869–1890
- Successor: Syracuse Consolidated Street Railway

Technical
- Track gauge: 4 ft 8 1/2 in (1,435 mm) standard gauge

The New Brighton and Onondaga Valley Railroad, a horse-drawn street trolley line, was chartered on May 5, 1869, in Syracuse, New York. The road was also known as the New Brighton and Onondaga Railroad.

The company merged with Syracuse Consolidated Street Railway in 1890, after an agreement was made that allowed the new company to lease the lines.
