= Utica and Mohawk Valley Railway =

Overview
- Headquarters: Utica, New York
- Dates of operation: 1901–1938
- Predecessor: Utica Suburban Railway Company
- Successor: New York State Railways

Technical
- Track gauge: 4 ft 8 1/2 in (1,435 mm)
- Electrification: 650v DC
- Length: 45 miles

The Utica and Mohawk Valley Railway was the result of the unification of all city and suburban streetcar lines serving Utica, New York, on November 27, 1901. The railway operated city streetcar service (with the acquisition of the Rome City Street Railroad in 1907) as well as a double-track interurban railway between Rome and Little Falls via Utica. The Utica and Mohawk Valley Railway was merged into New York State Railways in 1912. At its peak, the Utica Lines consisted of 17 transit routes operated with more than 100 cars. The line ceased operation in 1933, except for the section between Utica and Whitesboro that survived until 1938. The last city streetcars operated on May 31, 1941. The remaining transit routes were operated with buses and the franchise would be reorganized as the Utica Transit Corporation in 1948.

== Rome City Street Railroad ==
The Rome City Street Railroad was founded in 1885, and the first sections were opened for service in 1887. Three routes made up the 6.7-mile system, including Dominic Street, Floyd Avenue, and the Belt Line. In 1900, trolleys powered by compressed air replaced horses for propulsion, and the lines were rebuilt to handle the heavier cars. The experimental compressed air cars were retired in 1902, and horses made a brief return in 1903 while the line was electrified. The Rome City Street Railroad was acquired by the Utica and Mohawk Valley Railroad in 1907, which was subsequently merged into New York State Railways in 1912 and became part of the Utica Lines division. Some extensions were made to the city lines between 1911 and 1914 which resulted in the establishment of the Floyd Avenue line, and a connection was established with the interurban line at Whitesboro Street. Belt Line service was discontinued in 1923 in favor of operating separate lines on James, Madison, and Expense streets. One-man operation of trolleys was implemented in 1924, and the line that crossed the New York Central Railroad tracks was replaced with a bus because it required the use of a two-man trolley. The Rome city lines were never very profitable, and the James Street line was suspended in 1927, followed by the Madison Street line a year later. The remainder of the Rome streetcar lines were closed in 1930.
