= Rochester Railway Company =

Streetcar company in Rochester, NY

Overview
- Headquarters: Rochester, New York
- Locale: Rochester, New York
- Dates of operation: 1890–1938
- Predecessor: Rochester City and Brighton Railroad
- Successor: Rochester Transit Corporation

Technical
- Track gauge: 4 ft 8 1/2 in (1,435 mm)
- Electrification: 650v DC

The Rochester Railway Company operated a streetcar transit system throughout the city of Rochester from 1890 until its acquisition by Rochester Transit Corp. in 1938. Formed by a group of Pittsburgh investors, the Rochester Railway Company purchased the Rochester City & Brighton Railroad in 1890, followed by a lease of the Rochester Electric Railway in 1894. The Rochester and Suburban Railway was leased in 1905, extending the system's reach to Irondequoit and Sea Breeze. Rochester Railways was acquired by the Mohawk Valley Company, a subsidiary of the New York Central Railroad set up to take control of electric railways in its territory. In 1909 the holdings of the Mohawk Valley Company were consolidated as the New York State Railways.

== Early history (1862-1890) ==
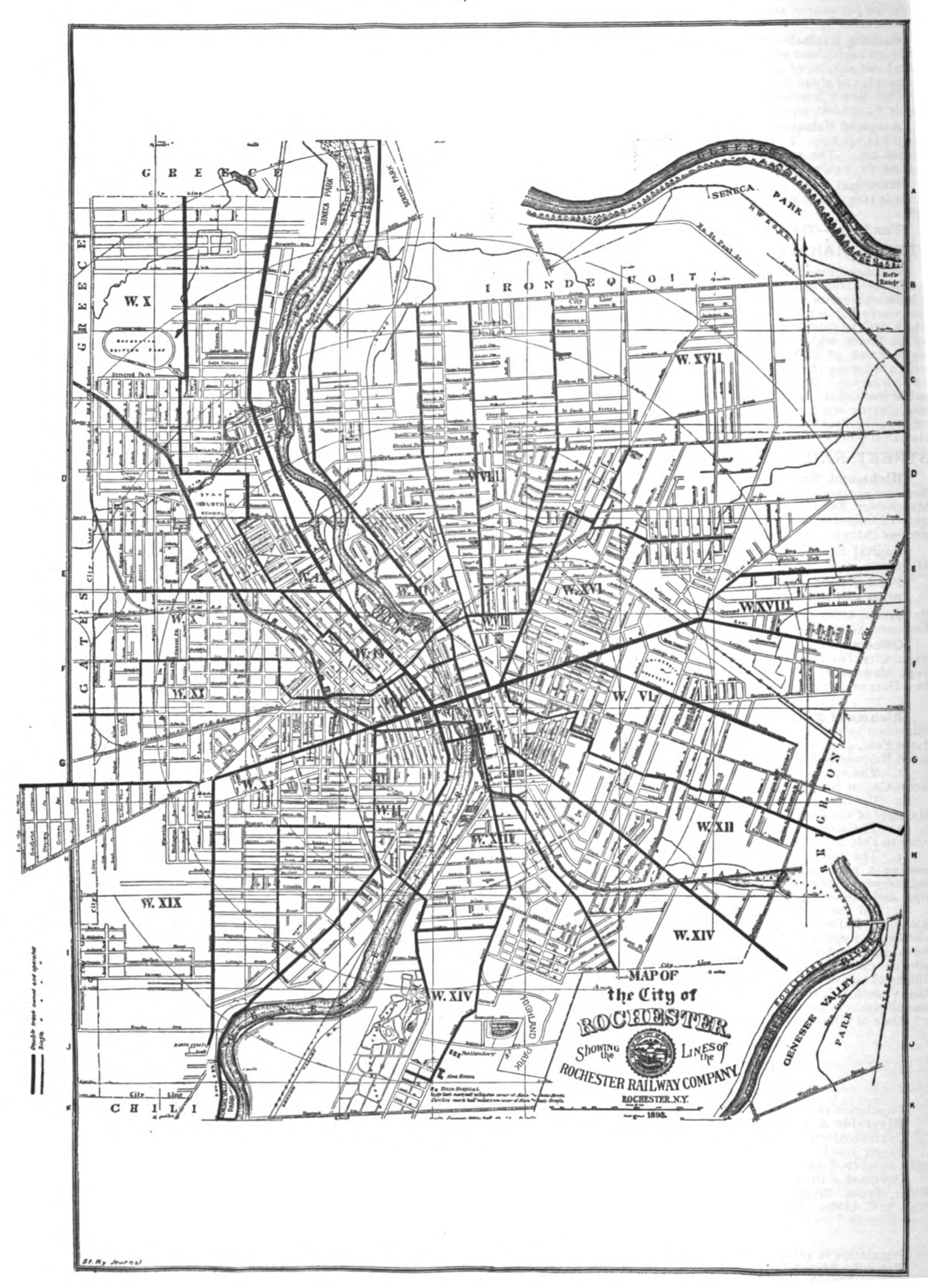
Rochester Railway Company c 1894

The Rochester City and Brighton Rail Road was incorporated as a horse railway transit line on May 31, 1862. The first line constructed ran from the railroad's headquarters on State Street to Mount Hope and opened in July 1863. A second line from State Street up Lake Avenue opened the same year. By October 1863 routes had been established between Buffalo Street and West Avenue, Alexander Street and Monroe Avenue, and along Main Street. By the end of the year, 6.6 miles of track had been constructed, and the company operated 18 cars with a stable of 48 horses. Horse-drawn enclosed sleighs were substituted for the cars during the winter months, a move that proved unpopular with the public. Due to pressure from the investors, the company was reorganized a year later. By 1866 the fledgling system expanded to 9.5 miles of track served by 100 cars. Harsh weather continued to plague the company, forcing the suspension of service during the winters of 1865 and 1866 and leading to reduced revenues as a result. Rising costs contributed to the company's financial problems.

The property was purchased at foreclosure in 1868 by local businessman Chauncey B. Woodworth and was reorganized as the Rochester City and Brighton Railroad. Service was again suspended during the winter of 1868. The railway resumed on March 25, 1869, with a concession granted allowing the railway to eliminate the conductor and operate lighter cars that only required one person to operate. Permission was granted in 1872 for the construction of a new line north along St. Paul Street, opening for service in 1873. The North Avenue line opened in 1878, running from Bay Street and connecting to the West Avenue line. That same year a ten-week strike by workers crippled the system, and when strike-breakers were brought in from New York to resume service, a riot broke out in the city.

Expansion continued in 1880 with the opening of the Allen and Jay Street line. A new line was also built along Park Avenue from Alexander Street to Vick Park, as well as an extension along Monroe Avenue to Field Street in 1881. The railway's first foray into bus transportation was made in 1882 with horse-drawn omnibus that ran from Four Corners to the city limits on East Avenue. Additional lines were constructed along Lyell Avenue in 1883. Ridership on the Park Avenue line encouraged another extension from Vick Park east to Brighton (portions of which have since been annexed by the city of Rochester). One of the last lines constructed was built along Hudson Avenue between Central and Clifford avenues in 1885.

At its peak in 1889, the railroad operated 183 cars over 40 miles of track, and stabled more than 800 horses at five barns around the city. A line was proposed for Plymouth Avenue, but strong opposition from the residents ended the project. Winter weather and labor unrest continued to restrict operations, however. Workers went on strike April 1, 1889. Replacement workers were brought in to maintain service, but riots broke out between the two factions on April 15. Police were brought in to put down the riots, but service did not resume until June 2.

== Formation of Rochester Railway Company ==
On January 21, 1890, the Rochester City and Brighton Railroad petitioned the city's common council to convert its form of motive power from horses to electricity. That February, the railroad was sold to the new Rochester Railway Company. Meanwhile, the Rochester Electric Railway Company was formed in 1887 to construct a line from the company's power plant in Charlotte to Ridge Road. The first cars were tested on July 3, 1889, ushering in the era of electric trolleys in Rochester. Electrification of the former Rochester City and Brighton lines was completed in the spring of 1893. In 1894, the Rochester Electric Railway was leased to Rochester Railway Company. The properties and franchises of the Crosstown Railroad and the South Park Railroad Company (both incorporated in 1889) were also absorbed into Rochester Railway Company.

Growth continued as the new company was authorized by the city to double-track any existing single-track lines in 1890. A new line was also constructed along Pinnacle Avenue (today known as South Clinton Avenue) in 1892. During this time, the railway experimented with color coding their various routes and painting the trolleys to match. Unfortunately, it was impossible to keep trolleys in captive service to their assigned route, and the color system was soon abandoned. With all lines electrified by 1894, the last horse car operated in Rochester in 1895. Streetcar mail collection service (railway mail service) was inaugurated on October 5, 1896, using a fleet of two special all-white trolley cars. These cars picked up mail, and also cancelled and sorted letters en route.

The Rochester and Lake Ontario Railway (R&LO) was chartered in 1879 to construct a steam-powered railroad connecting the lakeside community of Sea Breeze with the Rochester Railway at Portland Avenue. In 1893 the RL&O was leased to the Rochester and Irondequoit Railroad, which constructed an electric railway along St. Paul Boulevard north of Ridge Road to the lake at Summerville. In 1900 the Rochester and Suburban Railway purchased the Rochester and Irondequoit Railroad from the receivers and acquired the R&LO and electrified it. In 1905 the Rochester and Suburban Railway was leased to Rochester Railway Company. In 1902, Rochester Railway acquired control of the Rochester and Sodus Bay Railway.

The Rochester Railway and Light Co. was incorporated on May 26, 1904, to consolidate the Rochester Gas and Electric Company (not to be confused with present-day Rochester Gas and Electric Corp.) and the Rochester Light and Power Company with a controlling interest in the Rochester Railway Company. The merger was intended to combine all of the electric utility and streetcar properties in the city of Rochester. In 1905, trucking-firm executive George F. Roth was voted a director for the Rochester Electric Railway Company, which had become a subsidiary of that recently amalgamated utility and streetcar corporation.

== Control by New York State Railways ==
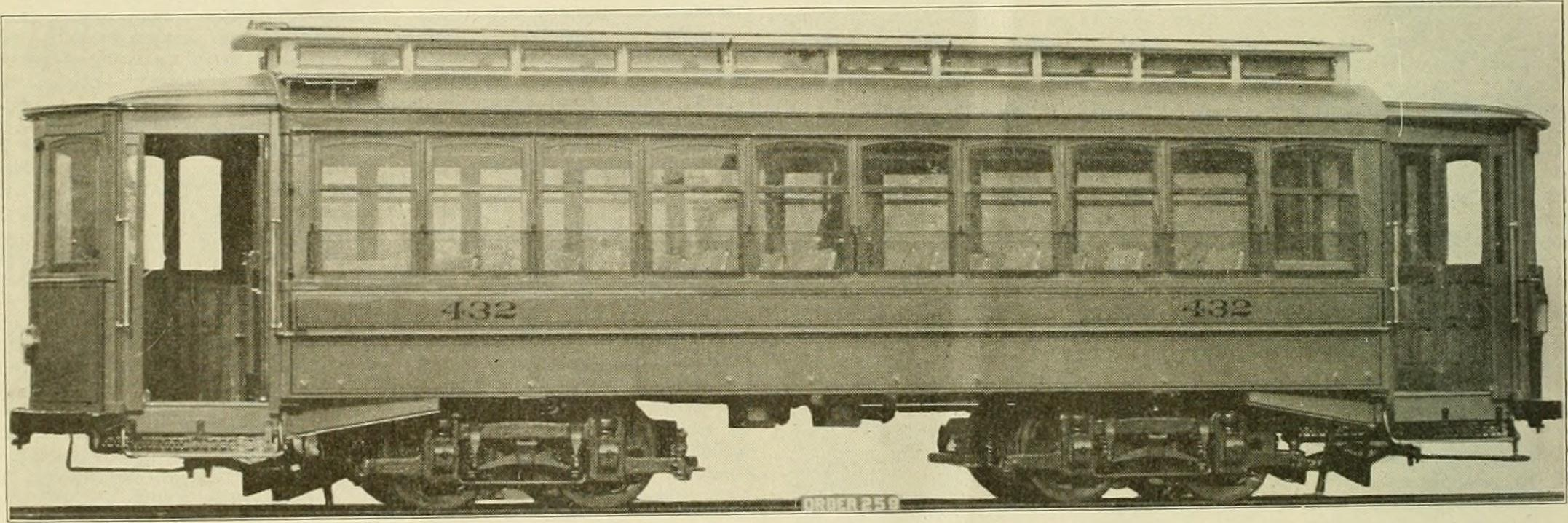
A Rochester Railway Streetcar (1906)

Through its Mohawk Valley Company subsidiary, the New York Central Railroad (NYC) purchased control of the Rochester Railway Company in 1905, and its parent company, the Rochester Railway and Light Co., along with the Rochester and Eastern Rapid Railway and the Rochester and Sodus Bay Railway lines. Together with the former Canandaigua Street Railroad operation, these four lines became the Rochester Lines of the New York State Railways in 1909. Control of the Rochester Railway Company was passed to New York State Railways, while ownership of the electric utility remained with the Mohawk Valley Company.

Collection of mail by trolley was discontinued on February 28, 1909, by order of the local postmaster general.

Rochester Railway Co. continued to extend its lines through the early 20th century to serve a growing city. The Main Street East line was extended to Blossom Road in 1906. The following year the Park Avenue line was extended along East Avenue to Winton Road. An extension of the Clinton South line was made in 1911. At the request of the city, an extension was built from the Sea Breeze line the new Durand Eastman Park between 1911 and 1912. Up until 1912, most lines originated and terminated in the downtown business district along Main Street, which resulted in congestion and delays. A system of through routing was initiated, creating continuous trolley routes from east side to west side lines. Operational headquarters was moved to Lake Avenue Station near Kodak Park in 1914. One of the last extensions constructed was an extension of the Clinton North line from Norton Street to Ridge Road in 1922. The final extension of service was constructed by the city of Rochester in the abandoned bed of the Erie Canal, and New York State Railways was selected to operate the Rochester Subway starting in 1927.

The Rochester Railways Coordinated Bus Lines was formed in the 1920s to operate bus transit lines separate from the railway. A brief experiment with trackless trolleys was made starting in 1923 on the Driving Park line. A total of 12 trackless trolleys were based out of the St. Paul Shops, but was never expanded. The last trackless trolley operated in Rochester on March 3, 1932. Bus operation was introduced in Rochester in the 1920s with the formation of the Rochester Railways Coordinated Bus Lines. New York State Railways also controlled the Darling Bus Line, the East Avenue Bus Co., and the Rochester Interubran Bus Co. (purchased in 1925).

== Decline and cutbacks ==
Rochester Lines Map 1929. Dashed lines are bus routes.

In June 1928, the New York Central sold its holdings in the Mohawk Valley Company and the New York State Railways to E.L. Phillips, president of Empire Power Corp. and the Long Island Lighting Company. The utility company holdings were sold again in 1929, and New York State Railways entered receivership upon default of its bonds. The Rochester and Sodus Bay Railway interurban line to Sodus was closed in June 1929, and local streetcar service to Glen Haven ended in 1933. The Rochester and Eastern Rapid Railway line to Geneva ran its last car on July 31, 1930, the same day Canandaigua local service ended (which had been provided by a bus since sometime in the 1920s).

The first streetcar line cutbacks came with the closure of the Exchange, Plymouth, Emerson, and Driving Park lines on August 18, 1929. Declining ridership followed as a result of the Great Depression and the increased use of private automobiles and the construction of better roads. Eleven more lines were shut down on August 30, 1936, including Durand-Eastman Park, Allen, Jefferson, South Clinton, Webster, Clifford, Central Park, Goodman North, Sea Breeze, Hudson, and Joseph. The Park Avenue, West Avenue, and University Avenue lines would follow in 1937.

== Succession by Rochester Transit Corp. (1938-1968) ==
With the parent company in receivership, a committee of bondholders and local supporters called for public control of the Rochester Lines. A reorganization plan was submitted to the courts in 1937, and in 1938 the new Rochester Transit Corporation (RTC) took over the operation of all former Rochester Railway Company bus and rail transit franchises. A year later, the Genesee, Lyell, South, St. Paul, Seneca Park, and Summerville lines were closed on May 23, 1939. Rochester Transit Corp. submitted a plan to the Public Service Commission in July 1940 to replace the remaining streetcar lines with buses. The proposal was approved and RTC began its plans for conversion. The Parsells and Thurston lines were closed on Christmas Eve in 1940, with the Monroe and North Clinton lines following on February 18, 1941. The Portland and Dewey lines closed on March 11, leaving only the Main East and Lake route as the last surface streetcar line in Rochester.

The last day for Main East and Lake service was March 31, 1941, with Car 1208 having the honors as the last car returning to the East Main carbarn in the early morning hours of April 1. In a show of ceremony to the assembled crowds, the general manager cut the overhead wires down as the last cars rolled down Main Street, with buses following closely behind.

The city of Rochester contracted with RTC for the continued operation of the Rochester Subway after 1941. In 1954 the city council voted to use a portion of the Subway route for construction of a new expressway, and that service would continue until December 31, 1955. However, delays in the design and engineering of the new expressway resulted in the city granting RTC a month-to-month contract for operation of the Subway. At the end of 1955, the city council voted to end service on June 30, 1956. When the last Subway car returned to the carbarn near the General Motors plant after midnight on July 1, the rail transit era in Rochester drew to a close.

In 1943, the board of directors gained enough support to buy out the remainder of Associated Gas and Electric Company's shares, returning full control of the company to Rochester interests. A series of strikes and labor unrest led the city of Rochester to take over and reorganize the system as Rochester Transit Service in 1968. The old Rochester Railway transit franchises operated by RTC were transferred to the Rochester-Genesee Regional Transportation Authority in 1969.
