= People's Railroad =

Overview
- Headquarters: Syracuse, New York
- Locale: Syracuse, New York
- Dates of operation: 1887–1896
- Successor: Syracuse Rapid Transit Railway

Technical
- Track gauge: 4 ft 8 1/2 in (1,435 mm) standard gauge

The People's Railroad was a street railway chartered in 1887 and opened for business in 1889 in Syracuse, New York. The total length of the line was 10.88 miles (17.51 km) with branches each 1 mile (1.6 km). In 1896, the company merged into Syracuse Rapid Transit Railway.
