= Rochester and Eastern Rapid Railway =

Interurban in New York

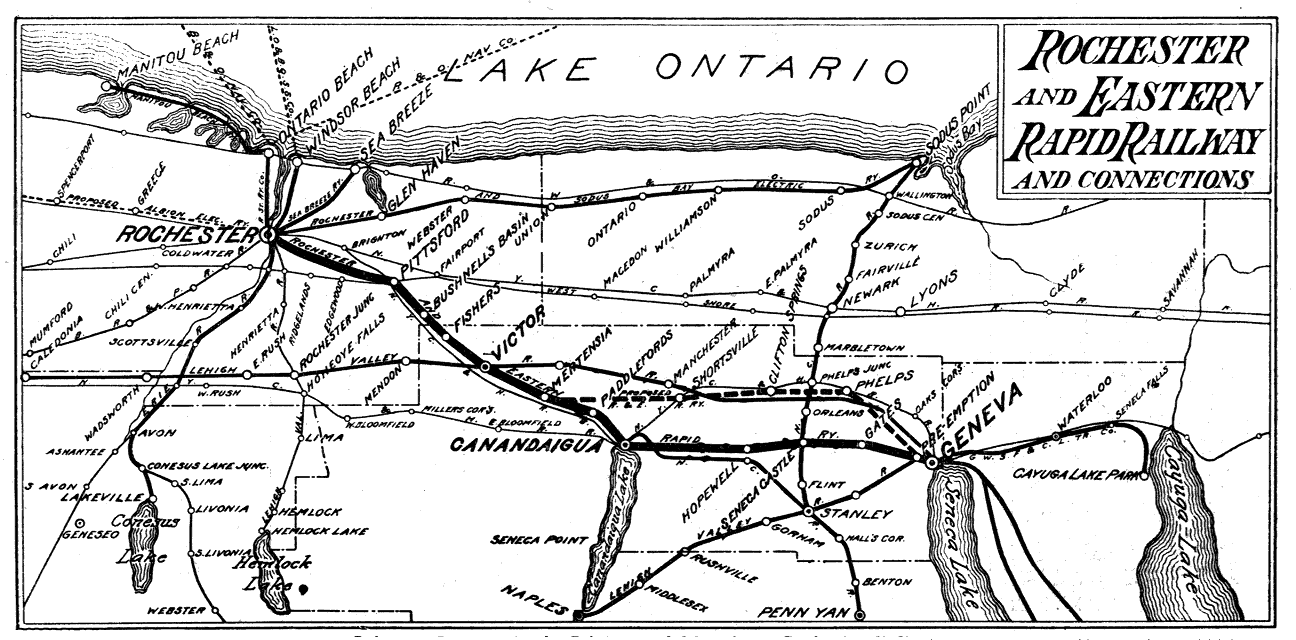

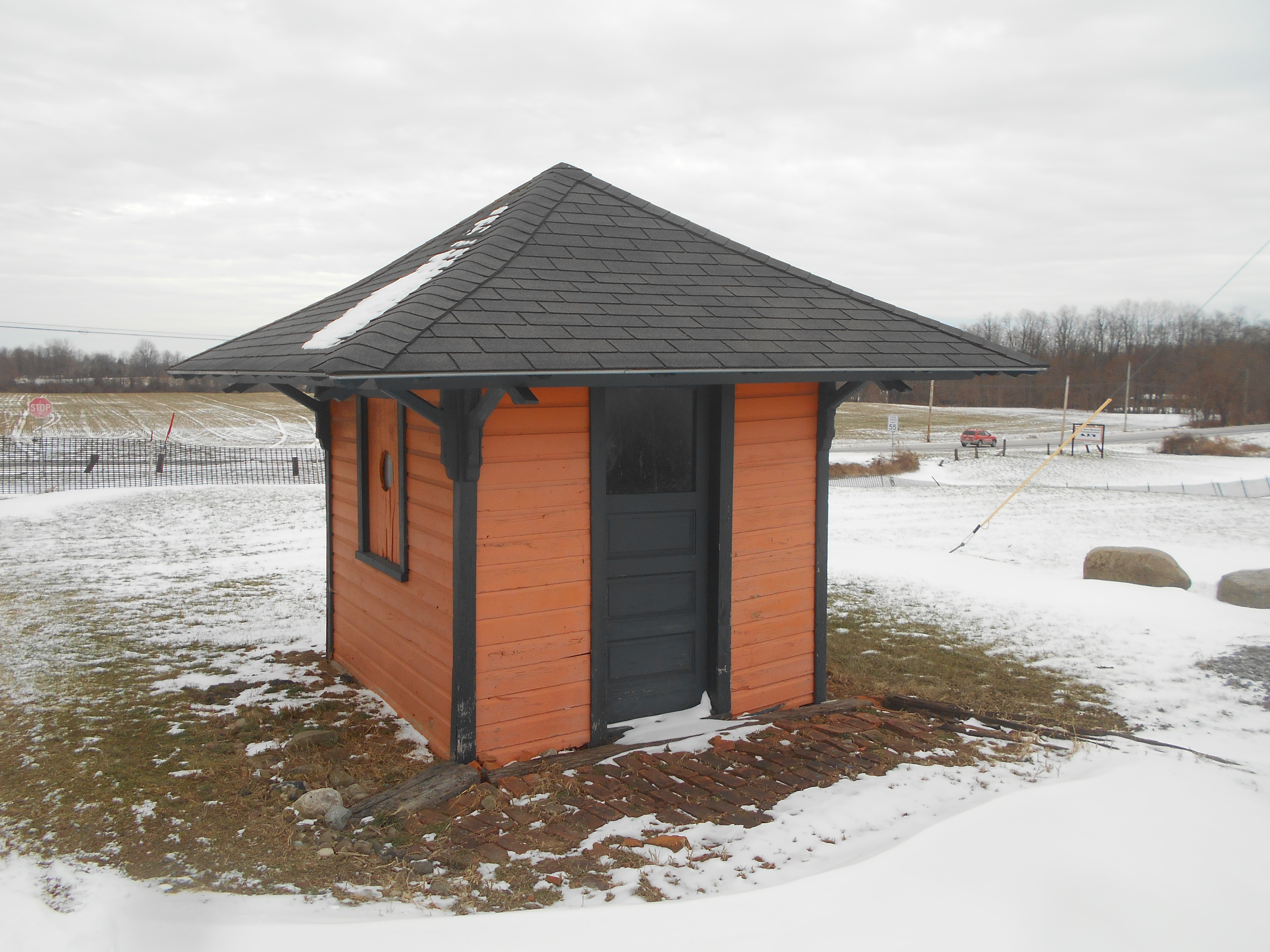
- A former Rochester and Eastern station, once located in Canandaigua, now on the property of the New York Museum of Transportation.

Overview
- Headquarters: Canandaigua, New York
- Dates of operation: 1901–1930
- Successor: New York State Railways

Technical
- Track gauge: 4 ft 8 1/2 in (1,435 mm)
- Electrification: 650v DC
- Length: 44 miles

The Rochester and Eastern Rapid Railway (R&ER) was an electric interurban railway in New York State, USA, connecting Rochester, Canandaigua, and Geneva.

== History ==
The company was chartered in 1901, the investors being mostly from Rochester. Service between that city and Canandaigua began in 1903, the power house and car barn being erected in the latter place. Completion to Geneva was in 1904. A spur line to Fairport was begun, but abandoned unfinished.

In 1905 the line came under control of the New York Central Railroad (NYC) through its Mohawk Valley Company subsidiary. In this period, Canandaigua was provided with a limited local streetcar service using one car.

The R&E was consolidated with the Rochester Railway Company and the Rochester and Sodus Bay Railway in 1909 to form New York State Railways which was wholly owned by New York Central. One change was that the power house was shut down, and electricity purchased from the local public utility company owing to economies of scale.

In its early years, the line attracted a heavy leisure traffic of people wishing to visit the Finger Lakes, but this was especially vulnerable to automobile competition. Ridership declined sharply through the 1920s, but nevertheless the interurban was re-routed to link up to the Rochester Subway at Rowlands in 1928, providing a faster and more direct route to serve downtown Rochester.

The effort was wasted, as New York State Railways petitioned to abandon the R&E in 1929. Months later, legal permission was granted to end all service on July 31, 1930. The line was dismantled soon after, and there was no successor.

== Route ==
Before 1928, the R&ER used the Rochester Railway Company streetcar tracks, and left the city on Monroe Avenue. In that year, it briefly connected with the Rochester Subway at Rowlands, at the south-east end of Monroe, before shutting down for good. The terminus in this short period was the City Hall subway stop.

The first major stop after Rochester city limits was Pittsford, whence the R&ER closely paralleled the NYC line to Canandaigua on the latter's north side. Stops were at Bushnell's Basin, Fishers, Victor, Mertensia (actually at Hathaway Corners) and Paddleford. In Canandaigua the line ran down Main Street, and the car barn was at the end of a stub line left when the main line turned east to Geneva.

The location of the car barn at the end of this stub line at the south end of Canandagua's Main Street meant that the city's local trolley service could shuttle from there to the city limits at the north end of Main Street and back again, without getting in the way of the interurban cars.

The main line then ran due east, with main stops at Hopewell, Seneca Castle, Gates and Pre-emption. It terminated in Geneva next to the City Hall on the north side of the Castle Street, halfway between Geneva and Exchange Streets.

At Geneva, the line connected with the Geneva, Seneca Falls and Auburn Railroad which took folk to Seneca Falls and to a terminus on the Cayuga Lake shore where there was an amusement park (it never got to Auburn). This little company also ran the Geneva streetcars.

In 1905, the R&ER was proposing a loop line from Mertensia through Shortsville, Clifton Springs and Phelps to Geneva, but this was abortive -although it appeared on its publicity maps.

The line had interchanges with the NYC, and also with the Pennsylvania Railroad at Canandagua and the Lehigh Valley Railroad at Geneva. However it was never able to develop any substantial carload freight traffic although, like most interurbans, it handled LCL (less-than-carload) freight in the baggage compartments of its cars.
