= Syracuse Rapid Transit Railway =

Overview
- Headquarters: Syracuse, New York
- Locale: Syracuse, New York
- Dates of operation: 1896–1912
- Successor: New York State Railways

Technical
- Track gauge: 4 ft 8 1/2 in (1,435 mm) standard gauge

The Syracuse Rapid Transit Railway, an interurban railroad, was chartered on May 21, 1896. The company was a consolidation of the Syracuse Street Railroad Company, the Syracuse Consolidated Street Railway Company and the People's Railroad Company which was formerly leased to the Syracuse Street Railroad Company.

The company was consolidated with the New York State Railways, affiliated with New York Central Railroad in 1912.

== New York State Railways (1912–1939) ==
Syracuse Rapid Transit Railway was consolidated with the New York State Railways, affiliated with New York Central Railroad in 1912. The former Syracuse Rapid Transit went on to form the majority of what would become the Syracuse Lines of New York State Railways. The parent company entered receivership in 1929, from which it emerged in 1934. The Syracuse Lines were reorganized as the Syracuse Transit Corporation on November 22, 1939. The last day of streetcar operation in Syracuse was January 4, 1941.
