= Genesee and Water Street Railroad =

Railway in New York

Overview
- Headquarters: Syracuse, New York
- Locale: Syracuse, New York
- Dates of operation: 1865–1890
- Successor: Syracuse Consolidated Street Railway

Technical
- Track gauge: 4 ft 8 1/2 in (1,435 mm) standard gauge

The Genesee and Water Street Railroad, a horse-drawn street trolley in Syracuse, New York, was established in 1865. The company was one of three different railways that were awarded operation franchise rights to run cars in James Street. The firm also secured the franchise to operate cars in Westcott Street, to South Beech Street, Euclid Avenue, College Place, University Place, Walnut Avenue and Madison Street.

The road merged with Syracuse Consolidated Street Railway in 1890, after an agreement was made that allowed the new company to lease the lines.
