= 2021 Rochester mayoral election =

- November 2, 2021
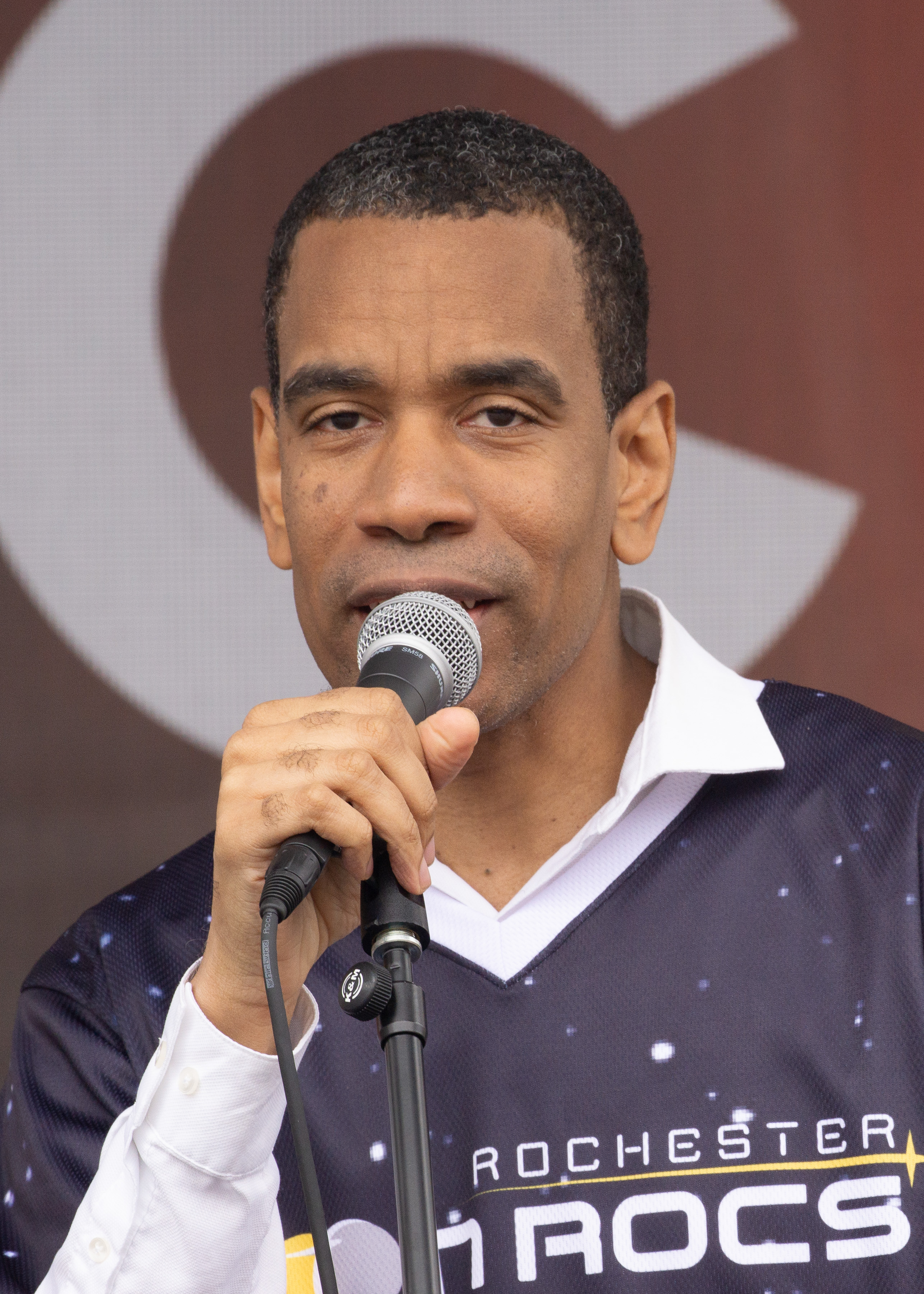
Nominee	Malik Evans
Party	Democratic
Alliance	Working Families
Popular vote	15,513
Percentage	98.57%
Mayor before election
Lovely Warren
Democratic
Elected mayor
Malik Evans
Democratic

The 2021 Rochester mayoral election was held on November 2, 2021. Incumbent Democratic mayor Lovely Warren ran for reelection to a third term in office but was defeated in the Democratic primary by city councilman Malik Evans.

== Background ==
In 2017, incumbent mayor Lovely Warren was investigated by the New York State Board of Elections for purported campaign finance violations related to two PACs created for her 2017 mayoral bid. It was alleged that Warren attempted to use the two PACs to subvert contribution limits. In October 2020, Monroe County District Attorney Sandra Doorley announced that a Monroe County grand jury voted to indict Warren and two officials who worked on her 2017 reelection campaign on charges related to these accusations. Warren described the investigation as a "political witch hunt" and plead not guilty to the charges.

Warren had previously faced controversy after the March 2020 killing of Daniel Prude at the hands of Rochester police and her failure to publicly comment on the investigation into it. On March 12, 2021, a probe by the city council determined that Mayor Warren and then-Rochester Chief of Police La'Ron Singletary concealed critical details about Prude's death from the public and lied about their knowledge of the case.

On May 19, 2021, Warren's husband Timothy Granison was stopped on the road by New York state troopers, who found a large quantity of cocaine in his car. Police then searched Warren and her husband's home, finding an unregistered handgun. Granison was charged with three felonies: criminal possession of a controlled substance, criminal possession of a controlled substance with intent to sell, and criminal possession of an unregistered firearm. He pleaded not guilty to all three charges and was released on his own recognizance. Granison was one of seven people who were arrested as part of a larger investigation by the Rochester Police Department into the presence and proliferation of illegal drugs within the city. Warren, who is separated from her husband, maintained her innocence and claimed that the investigation was politically motivated. As evidence of this she commented that her husband's trial was set for June 21, one day before the Democratic primary, even though that date was actually requested by her husband's lawyer.

== Democratic primary ==
Evans declared his candidacy on Martin Luther King Jr. Day 2021. Upon his entry into the race, Warren's campaign released the following statement:

We've prepared for this moment. All over the country unfortunately it's been our brothers that have been first in line to take on sisters. The powers that be playbook hasn't changed since the days of slavery. We know our ancestors are looking down upon us and asking when will our people learn. The Warren Campaign is committed to breaking these generational curses. We will run on our record of service and our record of results. We're confident that He who delivered us two victories before will deliver us another victory.

Warren was the only candidate to seek the endorsement of the Rochester Democratic Committee, and received it on February 8, winning 63% of the committee members' votes. Although Evans chose not to participate in the endorsement process, saying he wished to "avoid the divisiveness of internal Democratic Party politics," he still received 31% of the votes.

=== Candidates ===
==== Declared ====
- Malik Evans, at-large city councillor and former president of the Rochester Board of Education
- Lovely Warren, incumbent mayor (endorsed by committee)

=== Endorsements ===
Malik Evans
- American Federation of State, County, and Municipal Employees
- Civil Service Employees Association
- Working Families Party
- Cedric Alexander, former deputy mayor of Rochester and interim Rochester Police Department chief
Lovely Warren
- Loretta Scott, president of the Rochester City Council

=== Polling ===
Poll source	Date(s) administered	Sample size	Margin of error	Lovely Warren	Malik Evans	Undecided
SurveyUSA	June 1–8, 2021	412 (LV)	± 7.6%	35%	48%	17%
WROC-TV/Emerson College	May 21–22, 2021	1000 (LV)	± 3.8%	39%	49%	12%

=== Results ===
The Democratic primary was held on June 22. Malik Evans defeated the incumbent mayor in a landslide victory.

Democratic primary
Party	Candidate	Votes	%
Democratic	Malik Evans	12,438	66.1%
Democratic	Lovely Warren (incumbent)	6,373	33.9%
Total votes		18,811	100.0%

== General election ==
As no other parties other than the Democratic and Working Families Party (who endorsed Evans) filed to run Evans ran unopposed in the general election.

=== Results ===
2021 Rochester mayoral election results
Party	Candidate	Votes	%
Democratic	Malik Evans	13,993	82.11%
Working Families	Malik Evans	2,813	16.51%
Total	Malik Evans	16,806	98.62%
Write-in		236	1.38%
Total votes		17,042	100.00%
Democratic hold			
