= 2013 Rochester mayoral election =

- November 5, 2013
- Turnout: 16.43%
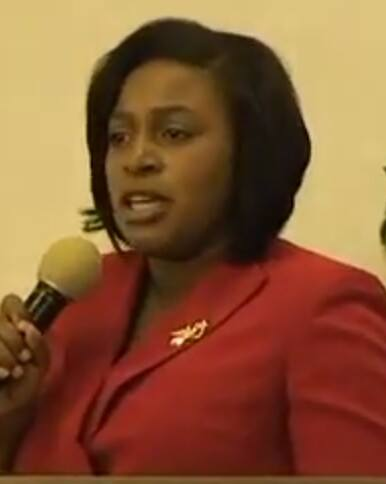

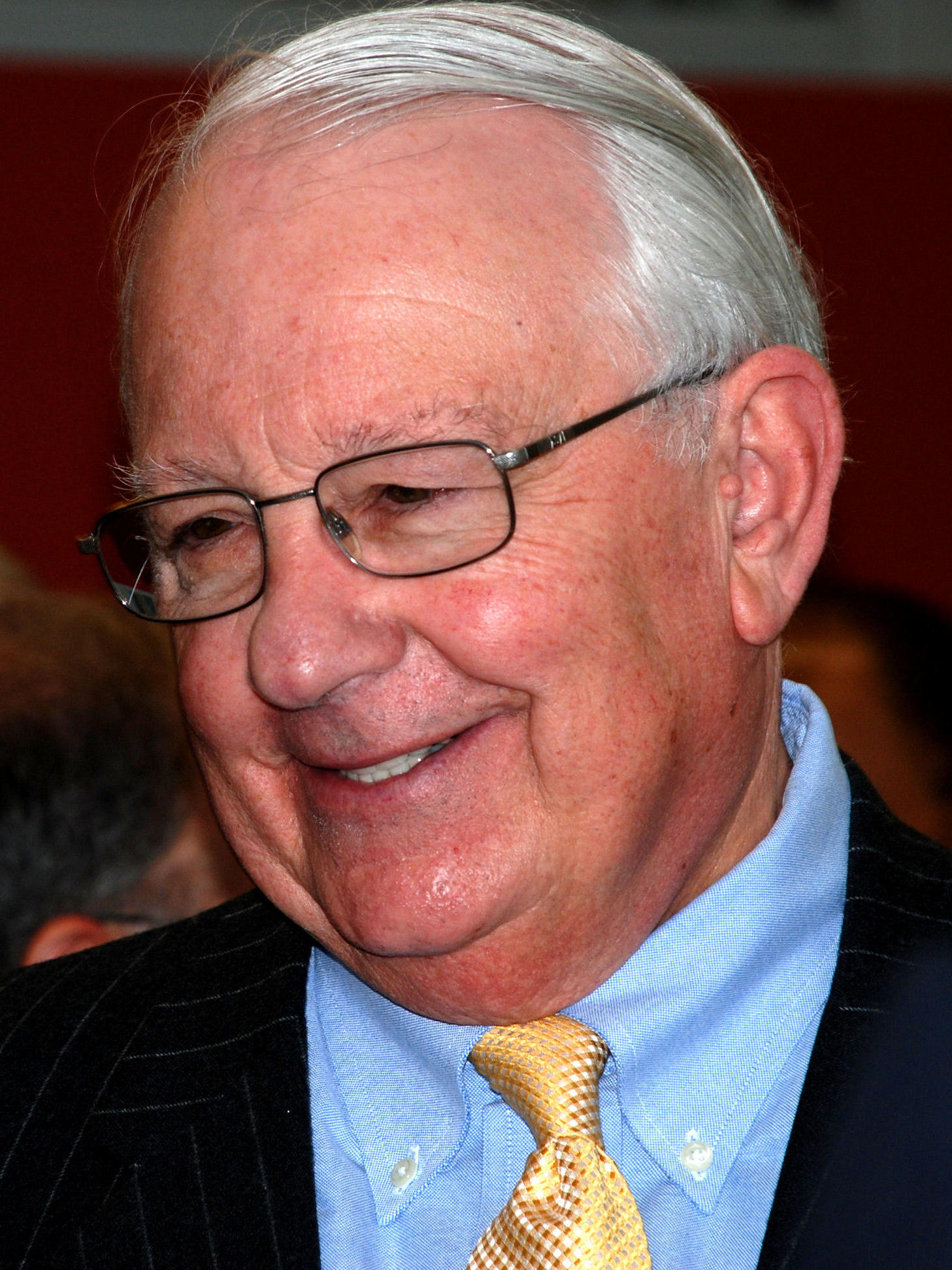

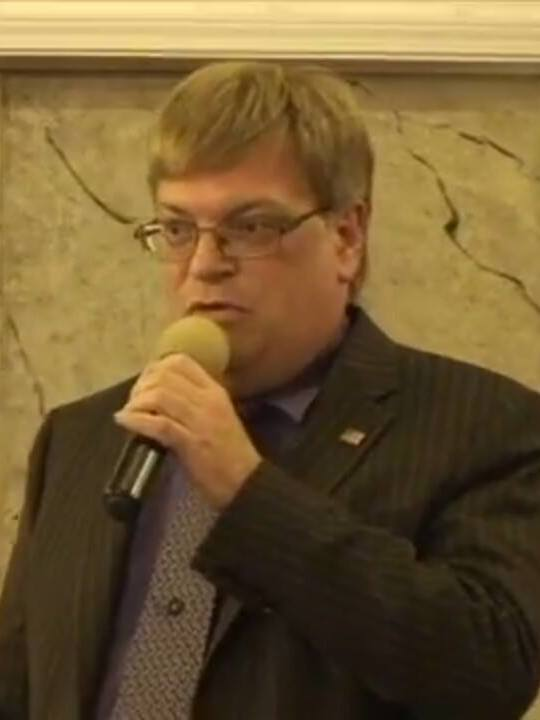
Nominee	Lovely Warren	Thomas Richards	Alex White
Party	Democratic	Independence	Green
Popular vote	18,794	13,415	1,784
Percentage	55.78%	39.82%	5.29%
Mayor before election
Thomas Richards
Democratic
Elected mayor
Lovely Warren
Democratic

The Rochester Mayoral Election of 2013 took place on November 5, 2013, in the City of Rochester, New York, United States. Democratic Mayor Thomas Richards, who first took office following Robert Duffy's resignation to take office of Lieutenant-Governor of New York in 2011, ran for reelection and was defeated in both the Democratic Primary and the general election by former City Council President Lovely A. Warren. Green Party candidate Alex White also ran and received a notable 5% of the vote. Considered a major upset victory, Lovely Warren defeated the incumbent mayor Richards in their party's primary against most major polling predictions.

== Background ==
In May 2010, Rochester Mayor Robert Duffy was chosen by Andrew Cuomo to be his lieutenant gubernatorial nominee. They won on November 2, 2010 with 62% of the vote. Upon Cuomo's victory in the 2010 New York Gubernatorial Election, Duffy selected deputy mayor Thomas Richards to succeed him as interim-Mayor of Rochester, which he served from December 31, 2010, to January 18, 2011, when Richards resigned to ensure he could run in a special election without violating terms of the Hatch Act, which could have jeopardized federal funding.

Following his resignation, a special election was called to determine who would hold the office of mayor until the following election year. Former Rochester mayor William A. Johnson, Jr. ran against Democrat-backed Richards in the race, which took place on March 29, 2011. Richards ultimately won the election with 48.48% of the vote to former Mayor Johnson's 41.72%.

== Primary ==
Richards announced on February 6, 2013, that he would run for re-election for a full term as Rochester mayor. He was challenged by city council president Lovely A. Warren. Considered the favorite to win and ahead in most major polls, Richards did not focus much attention to campaigning, instead choosing to continue his duties as mayor and spending time at home in the midst of a family emergency. In contrast, Warren spent much time on the campaign trail, going door to door and engaging with community leaders. Richards lost the Democratic primary to City Council President Lovely A. Warren on September 10, 2013, 57% to 42%. The defeat was considered a major upset, as Richards was better funded and led in the pre-vote polling.

Democratic primary results
Party	Candidate	Votes	%
Democratic	Lovely A. Warren	8,772	58.17
Democratic	Thomas S. Richards (incumbent)	6,309	41.83
Total votes		15,081	100%

== General Election ==
Following his defeat in the Democratic Primary, Richards ended his active campaign and endorsed Warren for mayor, but was kept as the chosen candidate on the Independence and Working Families lines. The Independence Party created the grass roots Turn Out for Tom campaign. In response, Richards stated that he would serve if re-elected mayor but denied having any contact with the Independence Party campaign. Richards lost the election to Warren 55% to 39% on November 8.

General election results
Party	Candidate	Votes	%
Democratic	Lovely A. Warren	18,794	55.78%
Independence	Thomas S. Richards	7,581	22.50%
Working Families	Thomas S. Richards	5,834	17.32%
Total	Thomas S. Richards (Incumbent)	13,415	39.82%
Green	Alex White	1,784	5.29%
Total votes		33,693	100%

Following the election, Lovely Warren was inaugurated in January 2014 and became the first female mayor of the city. Many of Richards' proposals and policies were kept under the Warren Administration including the construction of the new RGRTA bus terminal and the Inner Loop urban renewal project.
