= 2018 New York's 25th congressional district special election =

- November 6, 2018
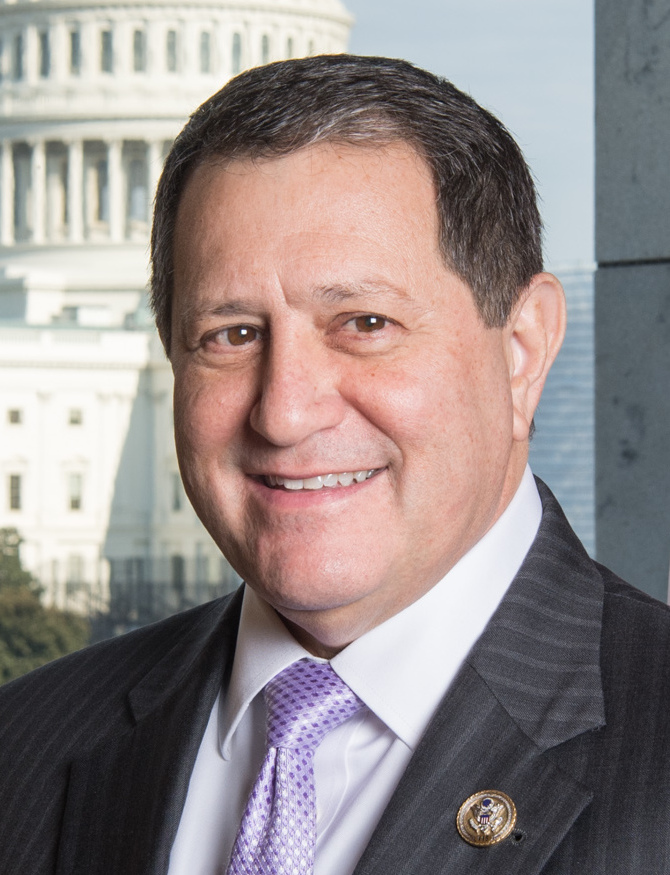

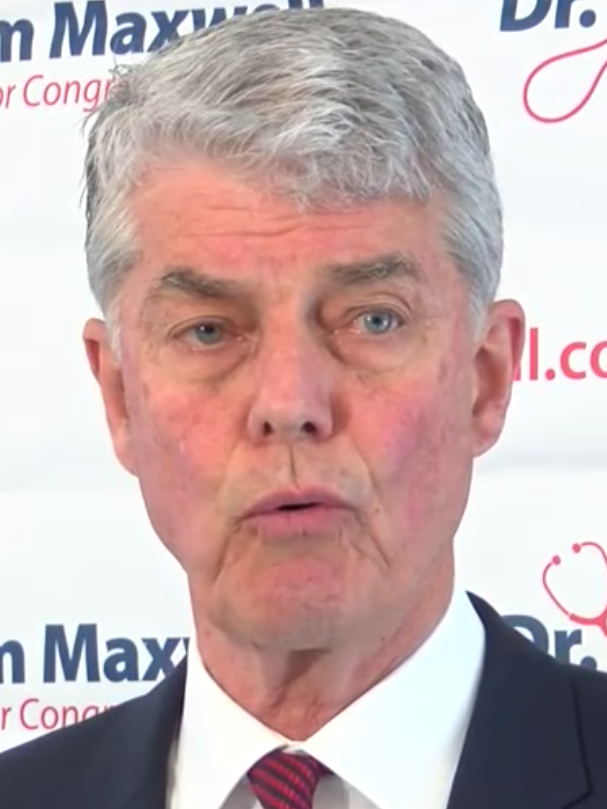
Nominee	Joseph Morelle	Jim Maxwell
Party	Democratic	Republican
Popular vote	141,290	101,085
Percentage	58.3%	41.7%
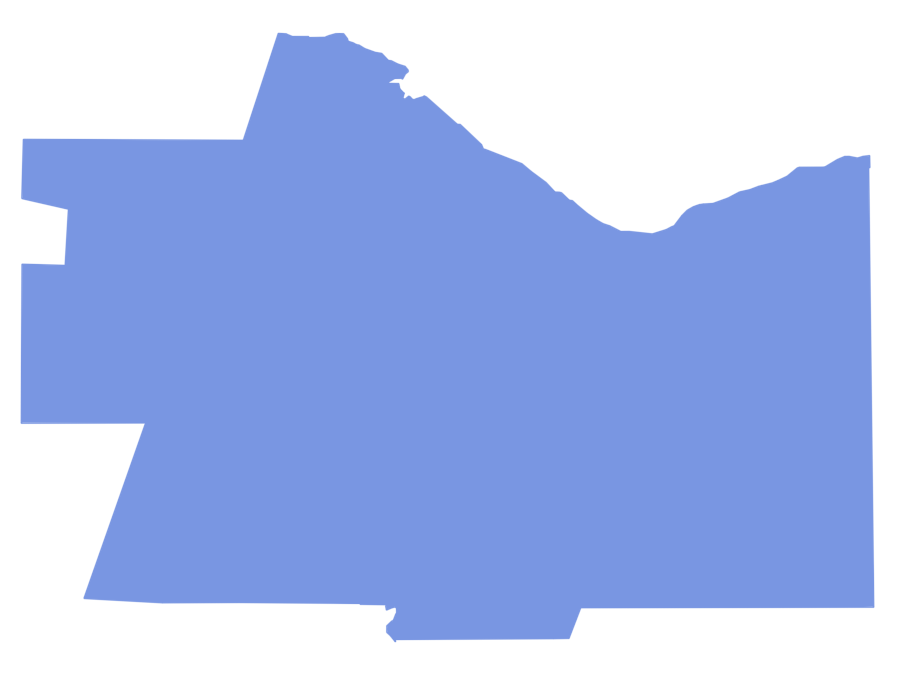
- County results Morelle: 50–60%
U.S. Representative before election
Louise Slaughter
Democratic
Elected U.S. Representative
Joseph Morelle
Democratic

A special election for New York's 25th congressional district was held following the death of U.S. Representative Louise Slaughter. Democrat Joseph Morelle defeated Republican Jim Maxwell on November 6, 2018.

== Background ==
Incumbent representative Louise Slaughter died at the age of 88 on March 16, 2018, after suffering a concussion earlier in the month.

Following precedent set in 2010, concurrent elections were held in November, one to fill the remainder of Slaughter's term, and the other to fill the seat for the next term. The district was left without Congressional representation until then.

Nominees for special elections are selected by the parties in the counties that comprise the congressional district. There are no primaries. The filing deadline for party nominations was August 30, 2018, and for independent petitions was September 4, 2018.

== Democratic primary ==
The following information pertains to the regular election for the 25th District for a full term to the 116th Congress.

=== Candidates ===
==== Declared ====
- Rachel Barnhart, former television journalist, former Rochester mayoral candidate and founder of Rochester for All
- Adam McFadden, Rochester City Council member
- Joseph Morelle, New York State Assembly Majority Leader
- Robin Wilt, Brighton town board member

==== Declined ====
- Cedric Alexander, deputy mayor of Rochester, former police chief
- Adam Bello, Monroe County Clerk (endorsed Morelle)
- Harry Bronson, New York State Assemblyman (endorsed Morelle)
- Robert Duffy, former lieutenant governor of New York and former mayor of Rochester (endorsed Morelle)
- Andrew Gilchrist, teacher (running for State Assembly)
- Lovely Warren, mayor of Rochester (endorsed Morelle)
- Van White, Rochester School Board president

Democratic primary results
Party	Candidate	Votes	%
Democratic	Joseph Morelle	16,245	45.63%
Democratic	Rachel Barnhart	7,003	19.67%
Democratic	Robin Wilt	6,158	17.30%
Democratic	Adam McFadden	6,103	17.14%

== Republican primary ==
=== Candidates ===
==== Declared ====
- Jim Maxwell, neurosurgeon

==== Declined ====
- Mark Assini, 2014 & 2016 Republican nominee, Gates Town Supervisor
- Cheryl L. Dinolfo, Monroe County executive
- Joe Robach, New York state senator

== General election ==
As the winner of the special election, Morelle was sworn in on November 13 rather than waiting until the new Congressional term. He also won the regular election for a new two-year term beginning in January 2019.

=== Results ===
New York's 25th congressional district special election, 2018
Party	Candidate	Votes	%	±%
Democratic	Joseph Morelle	141,290	58.29%	+2.10%
Republican	Jim Maxwell	101,085	41.71%	−2.10%
Total votes		'242,375'	'100.0%'	N/A
Democratic hold				

By county

County	Joseph Morelle Democratic		Jim Maxwell Republican		Margin		Total votes
County	#	%	#	%	#	%	Total votes
Monroe (part)	141,290	58.29%	101,085	41.71%	40,205	16.58%	242,375
Totals	141,290	58.29%	101,085	41.71%	40,205	16.58%	242,375
