= 2011 Rochester mayoral special election =

- March 29, 2011
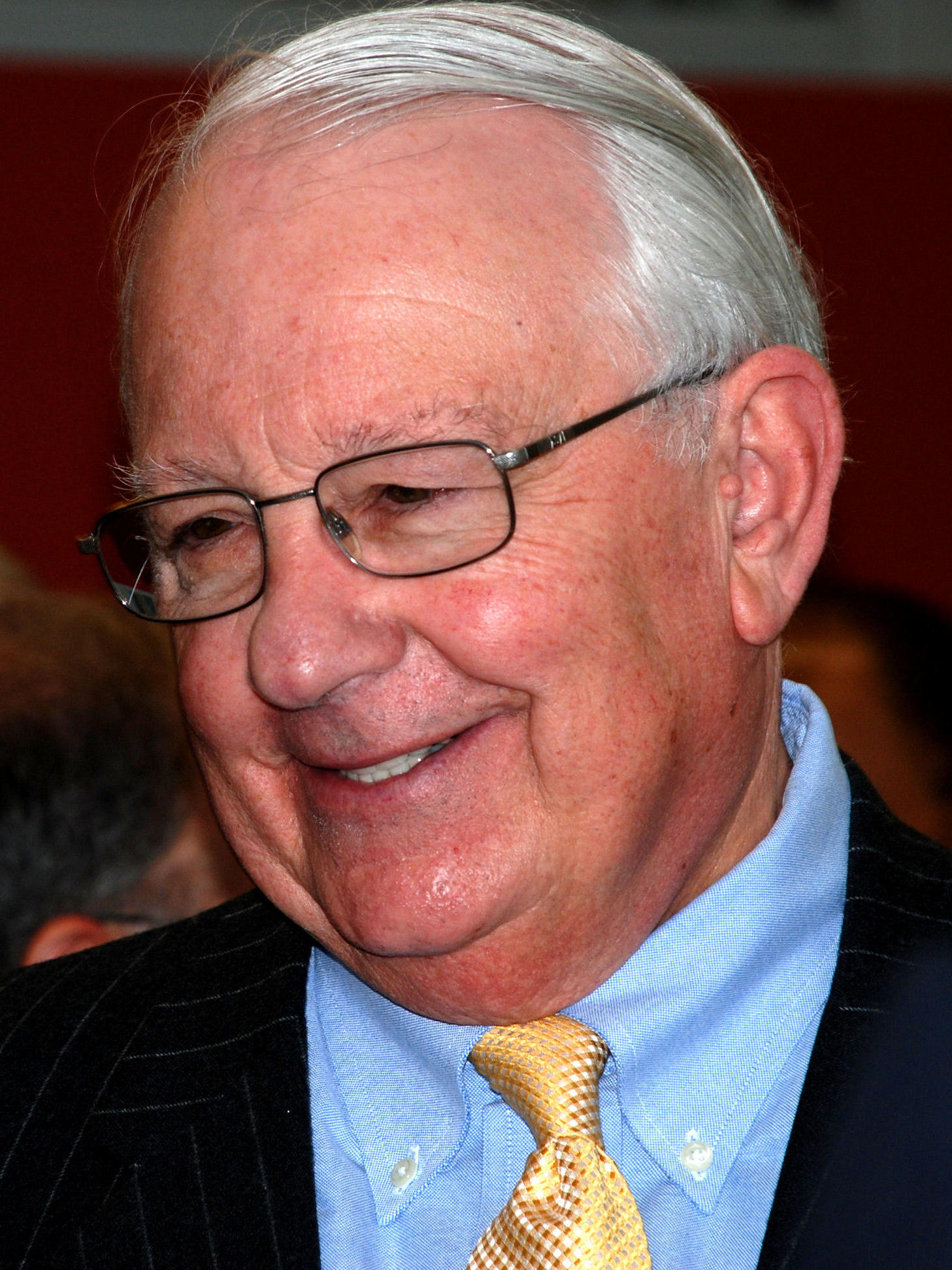

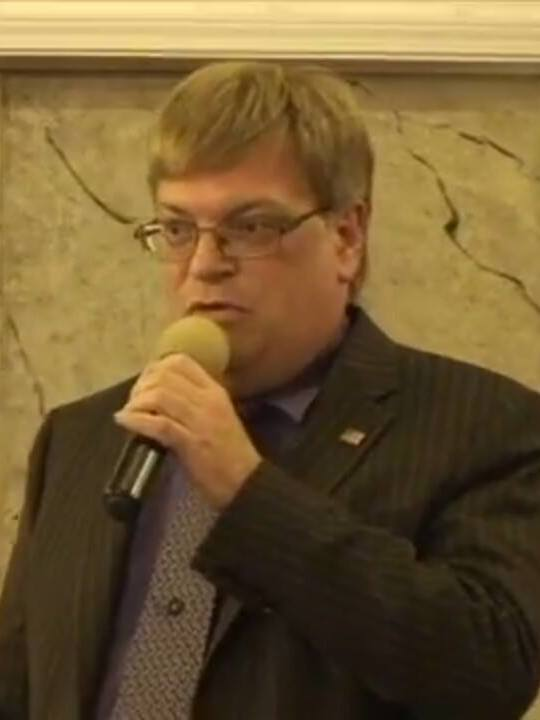
Nominee	Thomas Richards	William A. Johnson Jr.	Alex White
Party	Democratic	Working Families	Green
Popular vote	12,471	10,732	2,221
Percentage	49.05%	42.21%	8.74%
Mayor before election
Thomas Richards
Democratic
Elected mayor
Thomas Richards
Democratic

The 2011 Rochester mayoral special election took place on March 29, 2011, in the city of Rochester, New York, United States. Thomas Richards was elected over former mayor William A. Johnson Jr. to serve for the remainder of the term.

== Background ==
Incumbent Democratic Thomas Richards had been sworn in as interim mayor after Robert Duffy was elected lieutenant governor in 2010, previously having served as the City of Rochester Corporation Counsel and subsequently deputy mayor. There was some controversy about whether Richards was officially mayor, or whether the power appointing a new mayor rested solely with the City Council. The council decided to hold a special election rather than wait for a general election to be held in November. The immediacy of the election precluded the possibility of primaries, so candidates were chosen directly by the party leaders. Having decided to contest the special election for the rest of Duffy's term, Richards resigned to ensure he could run without violating terms of the Hatch Act, which could have jeopardized federal funding.

== Candidates ==
=== Democratic ===
- Thomas Richards - interim mayor

=== Working Families ===
- William A. Johnson Jr. - former mayor

=== Independence ===
- William A. Johnson Jr.

=== Green ===
- Alex White - businessman

== Results ==
Special election results
Party	Candidate	Votes	%
Democratic	Thomas Richards	12,471	49.05%
Working Families	William A. Johnson Jr.	8,144	32.03%
Independence	William A. Johnson Jr.	2,588	10.18%
Total	William A. Johnson Jr.	10,732	42.21%
Green	Alex White	2,221	8.74%
Total votes		25,424	100%
