= 2020 Rochester shooting =

Mass shooting in New York, U.S.

- Location: Pennsylvania Avenue; Rochester, New York, United States
- Date: September 19, 2020; 12:25 a.m.
- Attack type: Mass shooting
- Weapon: Firearm
- Deaths: 2
- Injuries: 14

A mass shooting took place on September 19, 2020, in Rochester, New York, at a late-night backyard party on Pennsylvania Avenue. Two people were killed and fourteen others were injured. No arrests have been made. It is considered the largest mass shooting in Rochester in recent memory.

== Background ==
The city police has been mired in scandal in the wake of the killing of Daniel Prude. Mayor Lovely Warren fired Rochester Police Department chief La'Ron Singletary on the Monday prior to the shooting, and he had been replaced by Mark Simmons. On the day preceding the shooting, the city council authorized an investigation into Prude's death.

House parties have been a cause of violence in Rochester in the months prior to the shooting, as well as being an issue for COVID-19 containment. After 70 people were shot in a six-week span between June 1 to July 15, Mayor Warren issued an emergency order banning public gatherings of five or more people between 11:00 p.m. and 5:00 a.m. as well as banning indoor gatherings of more than 10 people in locations without a liquor license. Warren said that the shootings happened at late night parties on city streets. Her order was protested by residents, including Free the People Roc and the Coalition for Black Lives, the groups saying "the city has shown a complete disregard for black lives as they continue to criminalize black and brown for simply existing in their neighborhoods."

== Incident ==
The shooting took place at a party that was intended to be small, however it was joined by people from two adjacent parties. Following an argument, three or four people opened fire with handguns. Police recovered more than forty bullet casings from the crime scene.

At 12:25 a.m. on September 19, the Rochester Police Department responded to calls of gunfire at a neighborhood near the Rochester Public Market and arrived to find about 100 people running down the street from the gunfire. In the night following the shooting, a large police response force was near Rochester Public Market.

== Victims ==
Two people, a man and a woman, were killed in the shooting, both aged 19. According to the police, they were bystanders and were not intentionally targeted by the gunmen. Fourteen others were wounded, all aged between 17 and 23 years old. One of the victims, a graduate of East High School, was honored with a memorial patch worn by the school's football team for the season starting in March 2021.

== Investigation ==
In October 2020, police offered a reward of up to $10,000 for information on the shooters. On March 19, 2021, the Rochester police gave an update to the case, saying that they had interviewed more than a hundred people and believed that 15 guns had been fired during the shooting. The police said that they were making good progress on the case, but was also stalled because of COVID considerations. According to police, an argument in front of the house led to a fight, which led to one individual firing a shot into the air, which then led several other people who were carrying guns to draw and fire.

== Reactions ==
Speaking in the hours after the incident, interim police chief Mark Simmons described the event as "another tragedy where individuals are having these illegal, unsanctioned house parties taking place in these properties, which number one is not safe because of the COVID-19 pandemic, because of the conditions. And then you add in alcohol and violence and it just becomes a recipe for disaster". Police did not identify any suspects yet, were uncertain if there were multiple shooters, and do not have any suspects in custody.

Mayor Warren called for the community to remain calm and exercise restraint as the police department investigates, and offered counselling for all affected by the shooting.
