= 2017 Rochester mayoral election =

- November 7, 2017
- Turnout: 14%
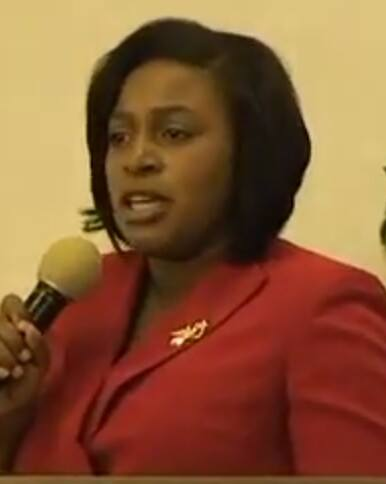

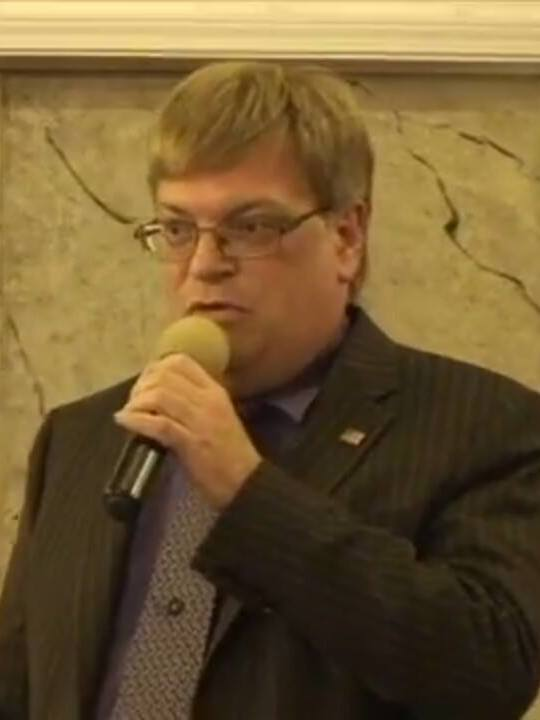
		GOP
Nominee	Lovely Warren	Tony Micchiche
Party	Democratic	Republican
Alliance	Women's Equality	Conservative; Reform
Popular vote	17,751	5,504
Percentage	60.14%	18.75%
	WFP
Nominee	James M. Sheppard	Alex White
Party	Working Families	Green
Alliance	Independence
Popular vote	4,140	1,579
Percentage	14.36%	5.33%
Mayor before election
Lovely Warren
Democratic
Elected mayor
Lovely Warren
Democratic

The Rochester Mayoral Election of 2017 was an election to determine who will hold the office of Mayor of Rochester, New York in the upcoming term. The election took place on November 7, 2017. Incumbent mayor Lovely Warren was elected to a second term in office.

== Primaries ==
The Democratic Primary took place on September 12, 2017. Incumbent mayor Lovely A. Warren defeated former police chief and current county legislator James Sheppard as well as former journalist Rachel Barnhart, and though Sheppard had secured the nomination of the Independence Party of New York and the Working Families Party, he stated that his campaign "was finished" following the primary.

Democratic primary results
Party	Candidate	Votes	%
Democratic	Lovely A. Warren (incumbent)	12,616	62.05%
Democratic	James M. Sheppard	4,526	22.26%
Democratic	Rachel Barnhart	3,189	15.69%
Total votes		20,331	100%

== Declared Candidates ==
As of April, six candidates declared their intent to run:

=== Democratic Party ===
- Lovely A. Warren, incumbent Mayor of Rochester.
- ^{1}James M. Sheppard, former Chief of the Rochester Police Department and current member of the Monroe County Legislature representing the 23rd district.
- Rachel Barnhart, former State Assembly candidate and broadcast journalist for WHAM-TV and WROC.
- ^{2}Alex White, local business owner and former Green Party candidate for mayor.

=== Republican Party ===
- Tony Micciche, current member of the Monroe County Legislature representing the 26th district.

=== Green Party ===
- ^{2}Alex White

=== Independent ===
- Lori Thomas, retired teacher.

== General Election ==
General election results
Party	Candidate	Votes	%
Democratic	Lovely A. Warren	17,963	58.78%
Women's Equality	Lovely A. Warren	417	1.36%
Total	Lovely A. Warren (Incumbent)	18,380	60.14%
Republican	Tony Micciche	4,558	14.91%
Conservative	Tony Micciche	983	3.22%
Reform	Tony Micciche	190	0.62%
Total	Tony Micciche	5,731	18.75%
Working Families	James M. Sheppard	2,582	8.45%
Independence	James M. Sheppard	1,806	5.91%
Total	James M. Sheppard	4,388	14.36%
Green	Alex White	1,629	5.33%
The People's	Lori F. Thomas	433	1.42%
Total votes		30,561	100%

=== Notes ===
1. James Sheppard ended his campaign after losing the Democratic primary, but was still on the ballot on the Independence Party and Working Families Party lines
2. Alex White sought the nomination of both the Green Party and the Democratic Party, but ran on the Green Party line
