= La'Ron Singletary =

American law enforcement official

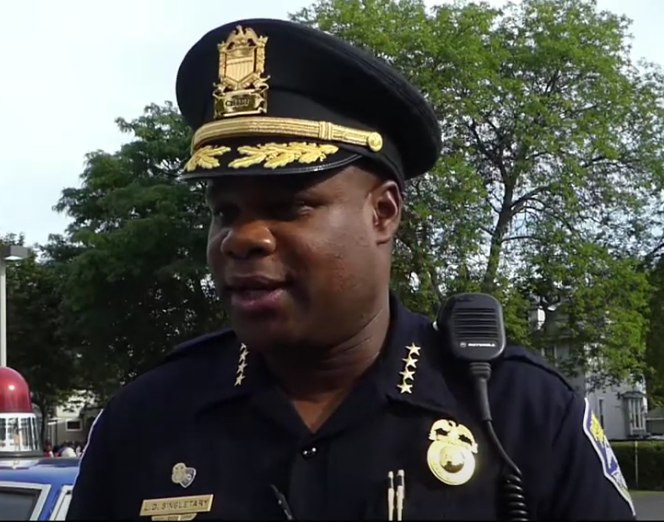
- Singletary in 2019

Chief of the Rochester Police Department
- In office July 1, 2019 – September 8, 2020
- Preceded by: Mark Simmons (Acting)
- Succeeded by: Cynthia Herriott-Sullivan (Acting)

Personal details
- Born: 1979 or 1980 (age 45–46) Rochester, New York, U.S.
- Party: Republican (2021–present)
- Other political affiliations: Democratic (before 2021)
- Education: Monroe Community College; Keuka College (BA); State University of New York, Brockport (MPA)

La'Ron Singletary (born 1979/1980) is an American law enforcement official who was active in the Rochester Police Department, serving as the chief of the department from July 2019 to September 2020. He resigned after disputes with then Rochester Mayor Lovely Warren in the aftermath of the killing of Daniel Prude. Formerly a Democrat, he ran for congress to represent New York's 25th congressional district in 2022 as a Republican, losing to Democratic incumbent Joseph Morelle.

== Early life and education ==
Singletary grew up in the 19th Ward neighborhood of Rochester, and wanted to become a police officer from a young age. He became a Police Explorer at 14 and graduated from John Marshall High School. He then went on to attend Monroe Community College, graduated from Keuka College, and then received a Master of Public Administration from SUNY Brockport.

== Rochester Police Department ==
Singletary joined the Rochester police force in 2000, and was sworn in by Robert Duffy. He became deputy chief of the department in January 2018, and became chief in July 2019.

While Singletary was police chief, Daniel Prude was killed in police custody in 2020. Prude was under the influence of Angel Dust and was walking the city streets naked before being physically restrained by the police. The incident gained nationwide attention, and after public pressure and a city council investigation that determined that Mayor Lovely Warren and Singletary concealed critical details about Prude's death from the public and lied about their knowledge of the case, Singletary and all other members of the Rochester Police Department command staff resigned. Later, a jury would not indict any of the officers involved.

In December 2020, Singletary accused Rochester mayor Lovely Warren of pressuring him to lie about the series of events following the death of Daniel Prude and firing him after he refused. Warren subsequently argued that Singletary downplayed the circumstances surrounding Prude's death. He later filed a successful lawsuit against the city asking for medical benefits promised to employees who work in the department for more than 20 years.

== Political career ==
Formerly a Democrat, Singletary joined the Republican Party in 2021.

In November 2021, Singletary announced that he was running for the U.S. House to represent New York's 25th district in 2022. He was encouraged to run by former state Senator Joseph Robach.

== Personal life ==
Singletary lives in Henrietta, New York.
