= Thomas P. Ryan Jr. =

American politician (1928–2003)

Thomas P. Ryan

63rd Mayor of Rochester, New York
- In office January 1, 1974 – December 31, 1993
- Preceded by: Stephen May
- Succeeded by: William A. Johnson Jr.

Personal details
- Born: December 3, 1928 Rochester, New York
- Died: March 14, 2003 (aged 74) Rochester, New York
- Party: Democratic
- Spouse: Charlotte Ryan
- Profession: Politician

Thomas P. Ryan Jr. (December 3, 1928 – March 14, 2003) was the 63rd Mayor of Rochester, New York.

== Biography ==
Ryan was born in 1928 in Rochester. He served in the Marine Corps and later graduated from St. Bonaventure University and Syracuse Law School.

In 1961, he was elected county supervisor of Monroe County. He was then elected to the Rochester city council. On January 9, 1973, the city council passed a resolution introduced by Ryan that condemned the Vietnam War, making Rochester one of the only American cities to formally take an anti-war position.

Ryan was first appointed mayor in 1974 after the Democratic Party won a majority of seats on the city council. He began his tenure as Mayor under the old council-manager government, in which the mayor was selected from among members of city council to be that body's presiding officer. A city manager appointed by city council and accountable to that body handled the day to day administrative duties of government. This system had been in place since 1928 as a result of government reforms championed by the late industrial magnate George Eastman. Ryan, who had exercised greater de facto influence over city policy than most of his predecessors under this system and functioned in many respects like a chief executive in policy matters, championed a change in the city charter to abolish the post of city manager and return to a "strong mayor" system like that in other major cities of New York State, in which the mayor was directly elected, directly accountable to voters, and served as chief executive of city government. The charter change was approved by city voters in 1984.

Ryan was elected to two more terms as mayor in 1985 and 1989. In addition to the revision in city government structure which began during his terms of office and continues in force today, Ryan became known for helping the city overcome a fiscal crisis in the 1970s to avoid bankruptcy and overseeing several revitalization projects in the city center. These included a new convention center, parks along the Genesee riverfront, and a new baseball stadium, which became Frontier Field. Despite his strong interest in city affairs and long tenure in office, Ryan was known for shyness and avoided public speeches or interviews.

In 1993, Ryan declined to run for another term and announced his retirement from politics. He died in Rochester in 2003.

Political offices
Preceded by Stephen May	Mayor of Rochester, NY; 1974 - 1994	Succeeded by William A. Johnson Jr.
