= 2001 Rochester mayoral election =

- November 6, 2001
Nominee	William A. Johnson Jr.	Luis Perez
Party	Democratic	Republican
Popular vote	27,121	7,919
Percentage	77.40%	22.60%
Mayor before election
William A. Johnson Jr.
Democratic
Elected mayor
William A. Johnson Jr.
Democratic

The 2001 Rochester mayoral election took place on November 6, 2001, in the city of Rochester, New York, United States. Incumbent William A. Johnson Jr. was elected to a third term as mayor of Rochester.

== Candidates ==
- William A. Johnson Jr. - incumbent mayor
- Luis Perez - pastor

== Results ==
General election results
Party	Candidate	Votes	%
Democratic	William A. Johnson Jr. (incumbent)	27,121	77.40%
Republican	Luis Perez	7,000	19.98%
Conservative	Luis Perez	919	2.62%
Total	Luis Perez	7,919	22.60%
Total votes		35,040	100%
