= Rachel Barnhart =

American journalist

Member of the Monroe County Legislature
- Incumbent
- Assumed office September 20, 2019
- Preceded by: Mark Muoio
- Constituency: 21st District (2019–2024); 17th District (2024–Present)

Personal details
- Born: Rachel Barnhart Rochester, New York, U.S.
- Party: Democratic
- Education: Cornell University (BA); Syracuse University (MPA)
- Website: rachbarnhart.com

Rachel Barnhart is an American journalist, former news anchor, and politician from Rochester, New York. As a Democrat, Barnhart represents the 17th District of the Monroe County Legislature, which covers North Winton Village and Browncroft in the City of Rochester, as well as a portion of Irondequoit.

== Early life, education, and early career ==
Barnhart graduated from John Marshall High School in the Rochester City School District. She is Jewish. She completed her undergraduate degree at Cornell University in Ithaca. She later earned her executive Master in Public Administration from Syracuse University’s Maxwell School of Citizenship and Public Affairs. Before entering politics, Barnhart was an investigative reporter for both WROC-TV (Channel 8) and WHAM-TV (Channel 13).

== Political career ==
In 2016, Barnhart left journalism to run for New York State Assembly against incumbent Harry Bronson in the 138th District, losing by 10 points in the primary. In 2017, she unsuccessfully challenged incumbent Mayor Lovely Warren in the democratic primary election alongside former police chief and county legislator James Sheppard. Following the death of Congresswoman Louise Slaughter in 2018, Barnhart ran in the field of Democrats vying to succeed her in New York's 25th Congressional District. Joe Morelle won the primary election and concurrent special election. Barnhart won her first election in 2019, winning the Democratic Primary to succeed Mark Muoio in the 21st District of the Monroe County Legislature. Muoio resigned the legislature in September of that year following fake residency allegations, leading to the early appointment of Barnhart following her victory in the primary.

== Election results ==
2017 Democratic Municipal Primary
Party	Candidate	Votes	%
Democratic	Lovely A. Warren (incumbent)	12,616	62.05%
Democratic	James M. Sheppard	4,526	22.26%
Democratic	Rachel A. Barnhart	3,189	15.69%
Total votes		20,331	100%

2018 Democratic primary results
Party	Candidate	Votes	%
Democratic	Joseph Morelle	16,245	45.63%
Democratic	Rachel A. Barnhart	7,003	19.67%
Democratic	Robin Wilt	6,158	17.30%
Democratic	Adam McFadden	6,103	17.14%
