= Malik Evans =

American politician

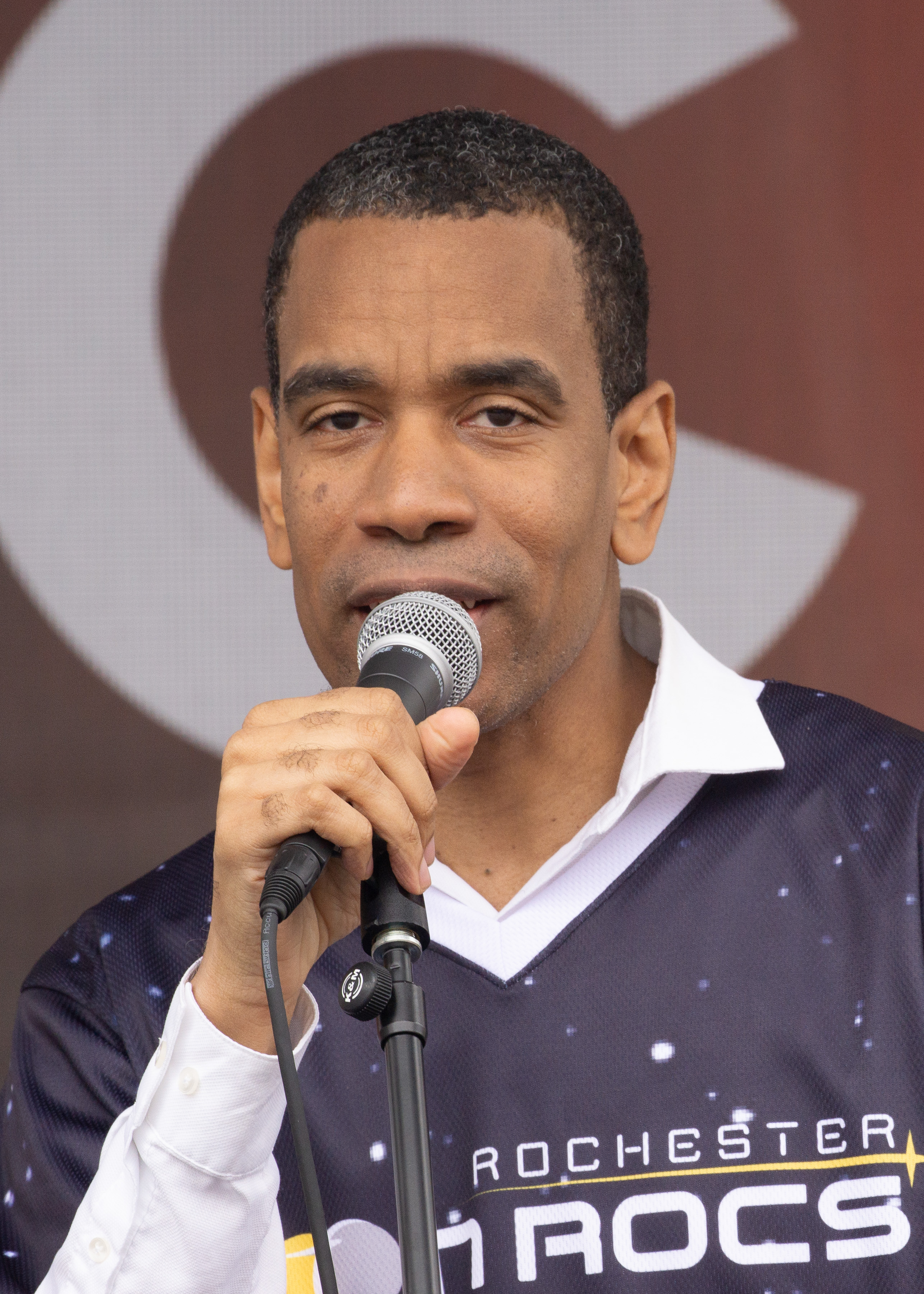
- Evans in 2024

71st Mayor of Rochester
- Incumbent
- Assumed office January 1, 2022
- Preceded by: James Smith

Member of the Rochester City Council at-large
- In office January 1, 2018 – January 1, 2022

President of the Rochester City School District Board of Education
- In office 2008–2013

Personal details
- Born: Rochester, New York, U.S.
- Party: Democratic
- Spouse: Shawanda Evans
- Children: 2
- Education: Nazareth College; University of Rochester
- Profession: Bank officer

Malik D. Evans is an American politician and banker who is the 71st and current Mayor of Rochester, New York. A member of the Democratic Party, Evans previously served on the Rochester City Council as an at-large member and on the Rochester City School Board including several years as its president.

== Early life ==
Evans was born to Gwendolyn Evans and Lawrance Lee Evans Sr., a minister who founded the First Community Interfaith Institute focusing on social justice and two time political candidate for the New York State Assembly against Gary Proud and Rochester City School Board in the 1970s. Evans attended Joseph C. Wilson Magnet High School, graduating in 1998, the University of Rochester, graduating in 2002 with an undergraduate degree and Nazareth University, graduating from the School of Management. Malik Evans is a member of Alpha Phi Alpha fraternity.

== Early career ==
In 1996, at age 16, Evans helped found the City/County Youth Council which later became Youth Voice, One Vision and the Mayor's Youth Advisory Council. While enrolled at the University of Rochester, Evans joined Mayor Bill Johnson's taskforce on city's nightclubs, studying options and code enforcement for black clubs and the Mayor's Council on Race and Ethnicity. Also while at the University of Rochester, Evans was part of a 200-student sit-in outside University President Thomas Jackson's office in 1999 calling for the preservation of the Frederick Douglass Institute for African and African-American Studies which was facing elimination at the time. He also previously worked as a legislative aide to former councilman Wade Norwood as one of his first jobs.

In 2003, Evans was first elected to the Rochester City School District school board. At age 23, he was the youngest person voted onto the board in its history. He served a total of 14 years on the board and was its president for five years from 2008 to 2013. During his tenure on the school board, the RCSD improved its graduation rates to over 50%. Evans also worked as the Prosperity Program Manager at ESL Federal Credit Union and at M&T Bank. After being elected to the city council in 2018, Evans was the Finance Committee chairman of the city council, a role which he retained until taking office as mayor.

== Mayor of Rochester ==
=== 2021 election ===
Evans declared his candidacy for mayor of Rochester on Martin Luther King Jr. Day 2021. He ran with the slogans of "restoring transparency" and "building bridges", also prioritizing economic development through providing job opportunities for youths and reducing gun violence by cracking down on illegal guns. Despite incumbent Rochester mayor Lovely Warren's numerous controversies, Evans refused to directly attack the mayor during his campaign and the election debate, instead focusing on promoting his platform.

On June 22, 2021, Evans handily defeated Warren in the Democratic primary, receiving 66% of the vote as opposed to Warren's 34%. Despite Evans outspending and out-raising Warren, some still expected Warren to win, given her past two election victories. Evans ran unopposed in the general election, as the Working Families Party also threw its support behind him and no other party filed to run. As expected, Evans won the election on November 2, 2021.

=== Tenure ===
Evans was officially sworn in as mayor on January 1, 2022. As mayor, he has attempted to end the crisis of substandard housing in the city. The majority of Rochester residents are renters, and a city commission found that half of rental properties in the city were substandard. In February 2022, a housing task force was formed to develop new programs. Based on the task force's recommendations, the city government hired a housing attorney to prosecute landlords with code violations on their properties and began subsidizing the construction of new housing stock for city residents.

Evans was re-elected in 2025, defeating challenges from local Democrats Mary Lupien and Shashi Sinha in the June primary election and Conservative candidate Louis Sabo in the November general election.

Political offices
Preceded by James Smith	Mayor of Rochester, NY; January 1, 2022 - present	Incumbent
