= 2025 Rochester mayoral election =

Local election in Rochester, New York, US

- November 4, 2025
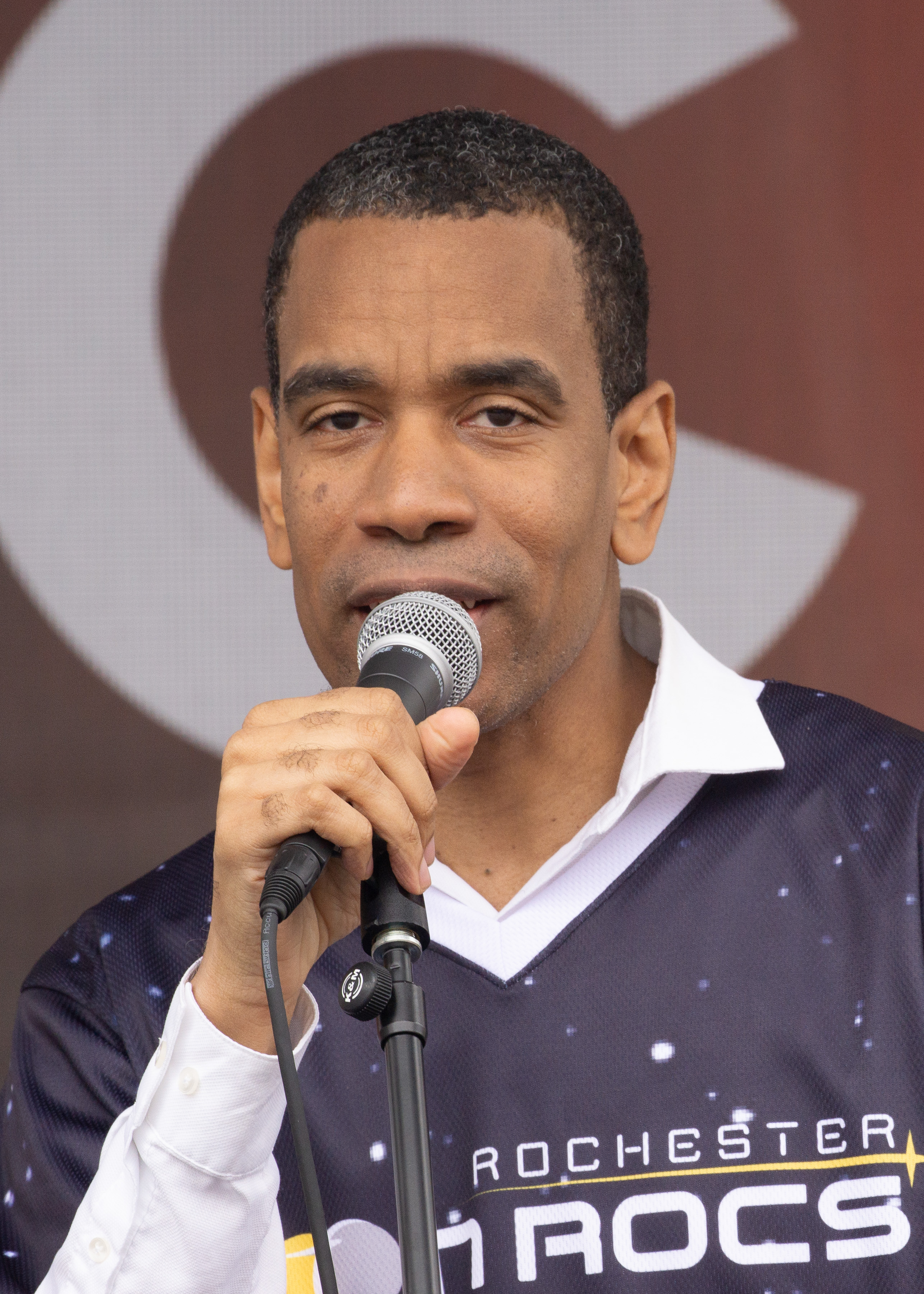

Candidate	Malik Evans	Louis Sabo
Party	Democratic	Conservative
Popular vote	18,685	2,737
Percentage	85.88%	12.58%
Mayor before election
Malik Evans
Democratic
Elected mayor
Malik Evans
Democratic

The 2025 Rochester mayoral election took place on November 4, 2025, in Rochester, New York. Incumbent mayor, Malik Evans, ran for a second term as mayor. The primary election was held on June 24, 2025.

Evans won the general election in a landslide, winning over 85% of the vote.

== Democratic primary ==
=== Candidates ===
==== Advanced to general ====
- Malik Evans, incumbent mayor

==== Eliminated in primary ====
- Mary Lupien, City Councilmember
- Shashi Sinha, IT executive

=== Endorsements ===
Malik Evans

Labor unions

- Amalgamated Transit Union Local 282
- American Federation of State, County and Municipal Employees Local 1635
- International Association of Fire Fighters Local 1071
- International Brotherhood of Teamsters
- International Union of Painters and Allied Trades District Council 4
- Iron Workers Local 33
- Laborers Local 435
- New York State United Teachers
- Rochester Building Trades
- Rochester Labor Council
- Rochester Teachers Association
- United Association Local 13
- United Auto Workers Local 1097

Organizations

- Monroe County Democratic Committee
Mary Lupien

Labor unions

- Workers United

Organizations

- Moms Demand Action
Declined to endorse

Individuals

- Ana Maria Archila, activist and co-director of the New York Working Families Party

Political parties

- Working Families Party

Organizations

- Citizen Action of New York

=== Results ===
Democratic primary
Party	Candidate	Votes	%
Democratic	Malik Evans (incumbent)	7,601	56.57%
Democratic	Mary Lupien	4,431	32.98%
Democratic	Shashi Sinha	1,329	9.89%
Write-in		76	0.57%
Total votes		13,437	100.00%

== Third-party candidates ==
=== Conservative Party ===
==== Nominee ====
- Louis Sabo, photographer and small business owner

== General election ==
=== Results ===
2025 Rochester mayoral election results
Party	Candidate	Votes	%
Democratic	Malik Evans (incumbent)	18,685	85.88%
Conservative	Louis Sabo	2,737	12.58%
Write-in		327	1.50%
Total votes			
