= Stephen May (politician) =

American politician (1931–2016)

62nd Mayor of Rochester
- In office January 1, 1970 – December 31, 1973
- Preceded by: Frank Lamb
- Succeeded by: Thomas Ryan

Personal details
- Born: July 30, 1931 Rochester, New York, U.S.
- Died: March 31, 2016 (aged 84) Washington, D.C., U.S.
- Party: Republican
- Spouse: Kathryn B. Wilson (m. 2007)
- Education: Wesleyan University; Georgetown University

Stephen May (July 30, 1931 – March 31, 2016) was an American lawyer who served as mayor of Rochester between 1970 and 1973 and as an assistant secretary for congressional relations at the U.S. Department of Housing and Urban Development in the Reagan administration. He is to date the last Republican mayor of Rochester.

== Biography ==
Born in Rochester, New York, on July 30, 1931, May attended Wesleyan University and Georgetown University, obtaining a law degree from the latter. He served with the United States Army. From 1969 to 1981 he was with the law firm of Branch, Turner and Wise in Rochester, New York. May has served the Empire State Report magazine as chairman of the board. As of 2007, May maintained dual residences in Washington, D.C. and mid-coast Maine and occupied his time as a writer and art critic.

May died on March 31, 2016, at Georgetown University Hospital in Washington, due to complications from an operation undergone the previous month.

== Political service ==
May was a member of the Rochester City Council between 1966 and 1973 and appointed 62nd Mayor of Rochester by his City Council peers in 1970 until he stepped down after the 1973 election returned a Democratic majority to office. Subsequently, between 1975 and 1979 he served as commissioner and chairman of the New York State Board of Elections. In 1978, he also served as a member of the Republican State Platform Committee. May's other political services have included standing as vice president of the New York State Conference of Mayors, as chairman of the Committee on Housing, and as a member of the White House Conference on Aging. In 1974, May ran unsuccessfully for NYS Comptroller as a Republican. His statewide youth coordinator Bruce Blakeman would also run unsuccessfully for State Comptroller as a Republican 24 years later in 1998.

Party political offices
Preceded by Edward Regan	Republican nominee for New York State Comptroller; 1974	Succeeded by Edward Regan
Political offices
Preceded by Frank Lamb	Mayor of Rochester, NY; 1970–1973	Succeeded by Thomas Ryan
