= Rochester Public Market =

Public market in Rochester, New York

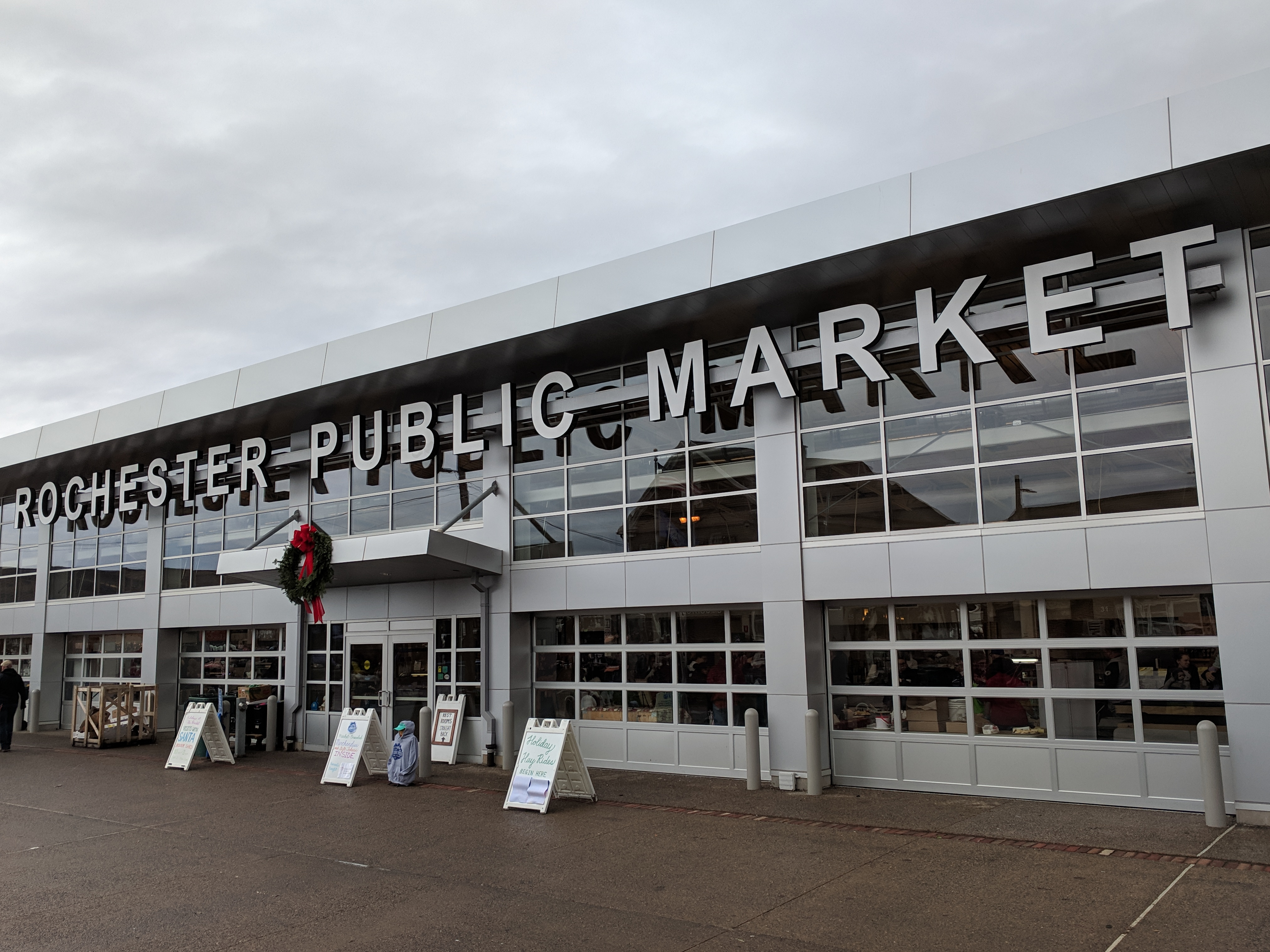
- The market in December 2018
- Interactive map of the Rochester Public Market area

General information
- Classification: Public market
- Location: 280 North Union Street, Rochester, New York
- Coordinates: 43.165°N 77.589°W
- Opened: 1905
- Management: City of Rochester Department of Recreation and Human Services

Website
- cityofrochester.gov/departments/department-recreation-and-human-services-drhs/public-market

The Rochester Public Market is a public market located at 280 North Union Street in Rochester, New York, United States. Opened in 1905, it is one of the oldest continuously operating public markets in the northeastern United States. The nine-acre (3.6 ha) market hosts more than 300 vendors on peak Saturdays and draws an estimated 1.5 million visitors annually, making it the city's most visited public gathering place. In 2010, it was named "America's Favorite Farmers Market" by the American Farmland Trust.

The market is owned and operated by the City of Rochester and is self-sustaining, fully supported by its vendor revenues.

== History ==
=== Early municipal markets ===
Rochester's municipal market tradition dates to 1827, when a market was built partially over the Genesee River at the west end of the Main Street bridge. This was succeeded by the Centre Market, built on the river's east side, which served as the city's primary market through the 19th century.

=== Establishment and early decades ===
In 1905, the market relocated to its current nine-acre (3.6 ha) site on North Union Street, less than a mile northeast of downtown Rochester in the Marketview Heights neighborhood. The new market received a six-ton granite fountain from the National Humane Alliance, one of only 125 such fountains distributed to prominent public places across the United States.

The market initially operated as a wholesale venue where local growers supplied neighborhood stores and vendors. John Wegman, co-founder of the Wegmans supermarket chain, sourced produce from the market in its early years. In 1913, the city permitted direct-to-consumer sales, which attracted a diverse clientele, particularly Italian and Jewish immigrants residing in surrounding neighborhoods. By the 1950s, the market drew approximately 20,000 visitors daily during peak seasons.

=== Renovation and expansion ===
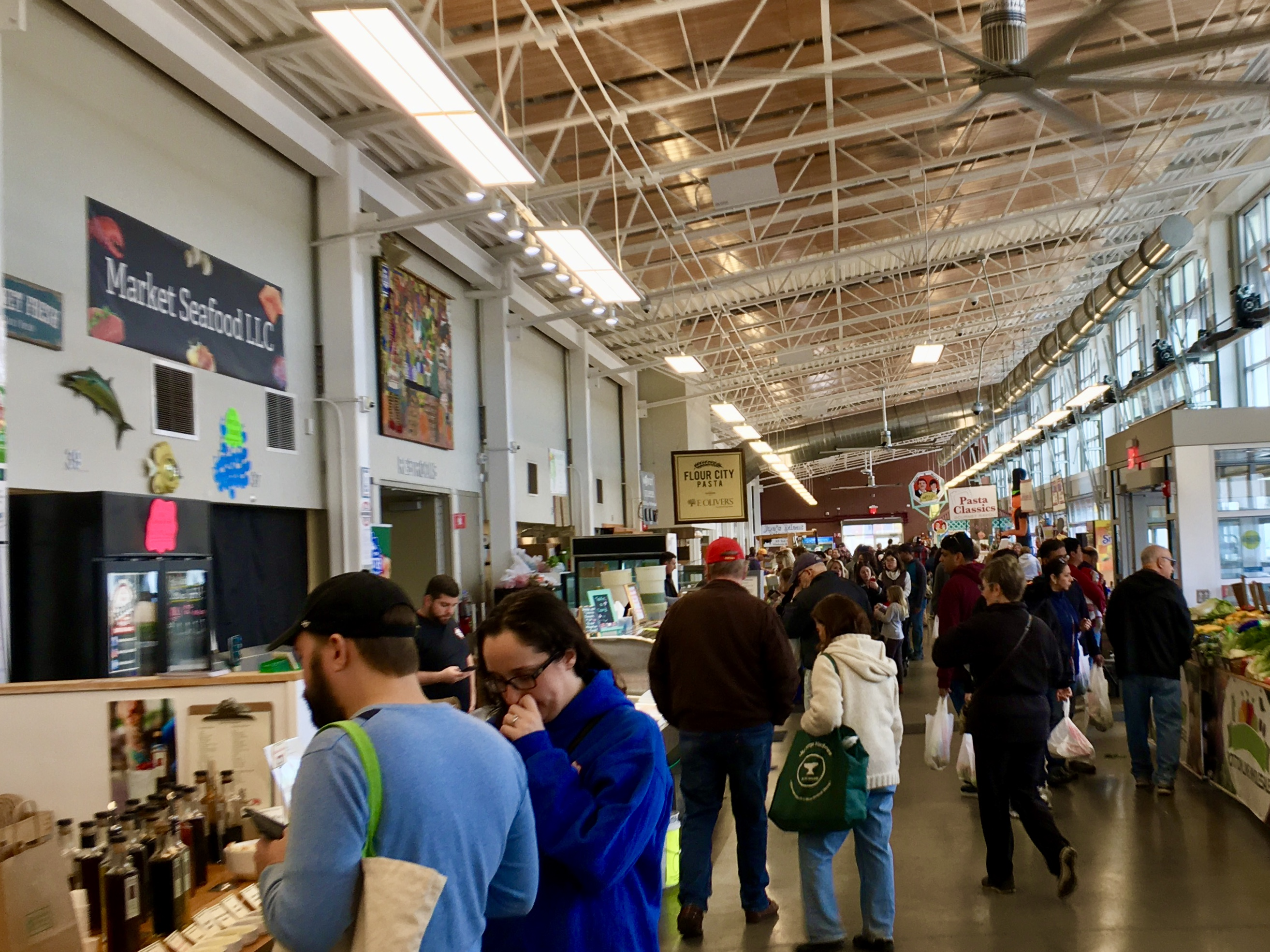
Indoor portion of the market in 2019

Between 2015 and 2017, the market underwent an $8.3 million renovation funded by Empire State Development, the New York State Department of Agriculture and Markets, the Dormitory Authority of the State of New York, and City of Rochester capital funds. The project replaced the 1978 "Wintershed" with a new 13,000-square-foot (1,200 m^{2}) indoor Shed B, constructed a new outdoor Shed D on the footprint of an original 1905 shed, added 46 vendor stalls, and installed four food kiosks made from repurposed steel shipping containers.

In 2019, the city restored and reinstalled one of the original 1905 National Humane Alliance fountains, which had been discovered on private property near Rochester in 2017, as the centerpiece of a new gathering courtyard.

A master plan completed in 2022 by Plan Architectural Studio provides a roadmap for future development, including enhanced mobility, additional housing, expanded vendor spaces, and event facilities. Planned future expansion includes replacement of Shed C with a second indoor facility and a two-story event space with rooftop seating, estimated at over $20 million.

== Operations ==
The market operates year-round on Tuesdays and Thursdays from 6:00 a.m. to 1:00 p.m. and Saturdays from 6:00 a.m. to 3:00 p.m. It contains approximately 230 outdoor covered vending spaces and 68 heated indoor spaces across four vendor sheds. Wholesale meat, produce, and cut-flower businesses operate on non-market days.

=== SNAP Token Program ===
The market operates what Empire State Development has described as the "nation's largest farmers' market SNAP program." In 2020, the program accounted for 23 percent of all SNAP benefits redeemed at the 290 participating markets across New York State and 2 percent of all SNAP redemptions at the 4,656 farmers markets accepting SNAP nationwide.

== Events ==
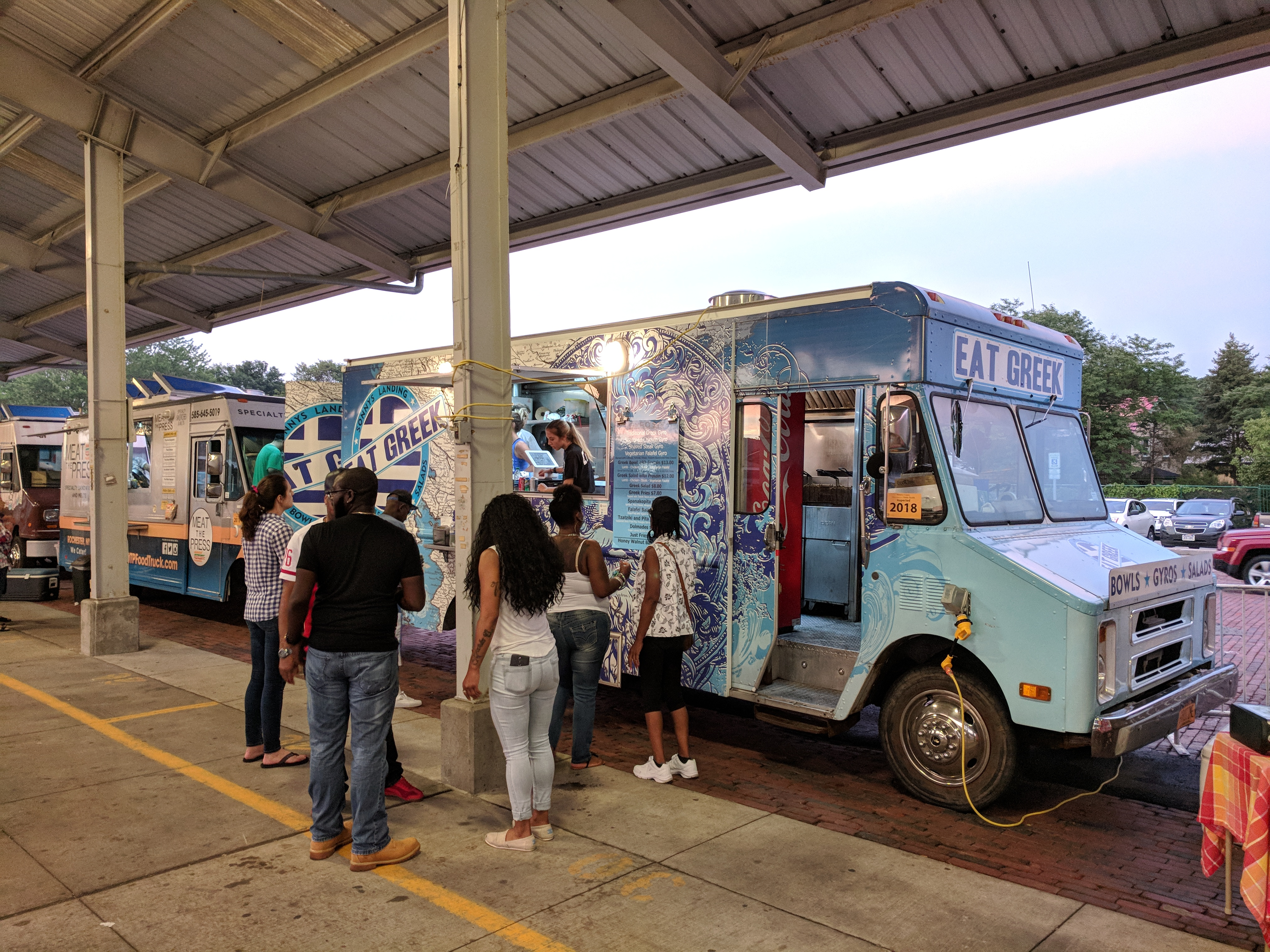
Food Truck Rodeo in 2018

The market hosts approximately 50 special events per year beyond regular market days, including:

- Flower City Days (May–June): horticultural sales featuring dozens of local nurseries and growers
- Food Truck Rodeos (April–September): monthly evening events with 30 or more mobile food vendors
- Holidays at the Market (December): an annual tradition for more than 25 years

== Inner Loop North ==
The market is directly adjacent to the planned Inner Loop North Transformation Project, which will remove a 1.5-mile (2.4 km) segment of the grade-separated Inner Loop expressway and replace it with an at-grade street network. The project, which received a $100 million Reconnecting Communities Pilot Program grant from the U.S. Department of Transportation in January 2025, is expected to reconnect downtown Rochester with the market's Marketview Heights neighborhood.

== See also ==
- Rochester, New York
- Inner Loop (Rochester)
- Marketplace
