= Lovely Warren =

American politician (born 1977)

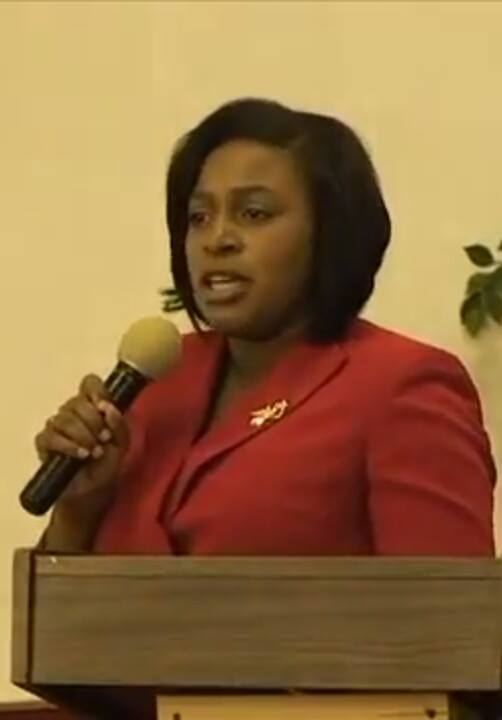
- Warren in 2013

69th Mayor of Rochester
- In office January 1, 2014 – December 1, 2021
- Preceded by: Thomas Richards
- Succeeded by: James Smith

Member of the Rochester City Council from the Northeast district
- In office May 2007 – 2013
- Preceded by: Benjamin L. Douglas
- Succeeded by: Michael A. Patterson

Personal details
- Born: July 1, 1977 (age 49) Rochester, New York, U.S.
- Party: Democratic
- Spouse: Timothy Granison
- Children: 1
- Education: John Jay College of Criminal Justice (BA); Albany Law School (JD)
- Profession: Lawyer

Lovely Ann Warren (born July 1, 1977) is an American politician and lawyer who served as the 69th mayor of Rochester, New York, from 2014 until her resignation in 2021. She was previously the president of the Rochester City Council. She was the first woman to serve as mayor of Rochester, as well as the second African American after William A. Johnson Jr..

== Early life and education ==
Warren was born and raised in Rochester, New York. Her mother, Elrita Warren, was a South Carolina native who worked in health care.

Warren graduated from Wilson Magnet High School and later earned a Bachelor of Arts degree in government from John Jay College of Criminal Justice in 2000, followed by a Juris Doctor degree from Albany Law School in 2003.

== Career ==
Warren began her career as a legislative assistant and chief of staff to New York Assemblyman David F. Gantt. She clerked for Rochester City Court Judge Teresa Johnson and served as a summer law clerk to New York Attorney General Eliot Spitzer. In 2004, Warren was admitted to practice law in New York.

In 2007, Warren was appointed to fill a vacant seat on Rochester's City Council and was elected to a full term later that year. In 2010, she was elected the fifth president of the Rochester City Council, becoming the youngest person to hold that office in Rochester's history.

In 2011, Warren participated in the We Live NY Summit at Cornell University. She has appeared on panels sponsored by the Rochester Downtown Development Corporation and the Rochester Chapter of the League of Women Voters. She also hosted youth events at City Hall for students of the Rochester City School District and has been a guest speaker at events for young people in the Rochester City School District and at colleges including the University of Rochester, Albany Law School, Towson University and Howard University.

=== 2013 Rochester mayoral election ===
Warren won the 2013 Democratic primary over incumbent mayor Thomas Richards by about 57 percent to 42 percent.

While Richards endorsed Warren and ended his active campaign, he remained a candidate on the Independence and Working Families lines. The Independence Party created the grassroots Turn Out for Tom campaign in an effort to get Richards re-elected mayor. Warren defeated Richards in the general election, receiving 56 percent of the vote to Richards's 39 percent; Green Party candidate Alex White received 5 percent.

=== Tenure ===
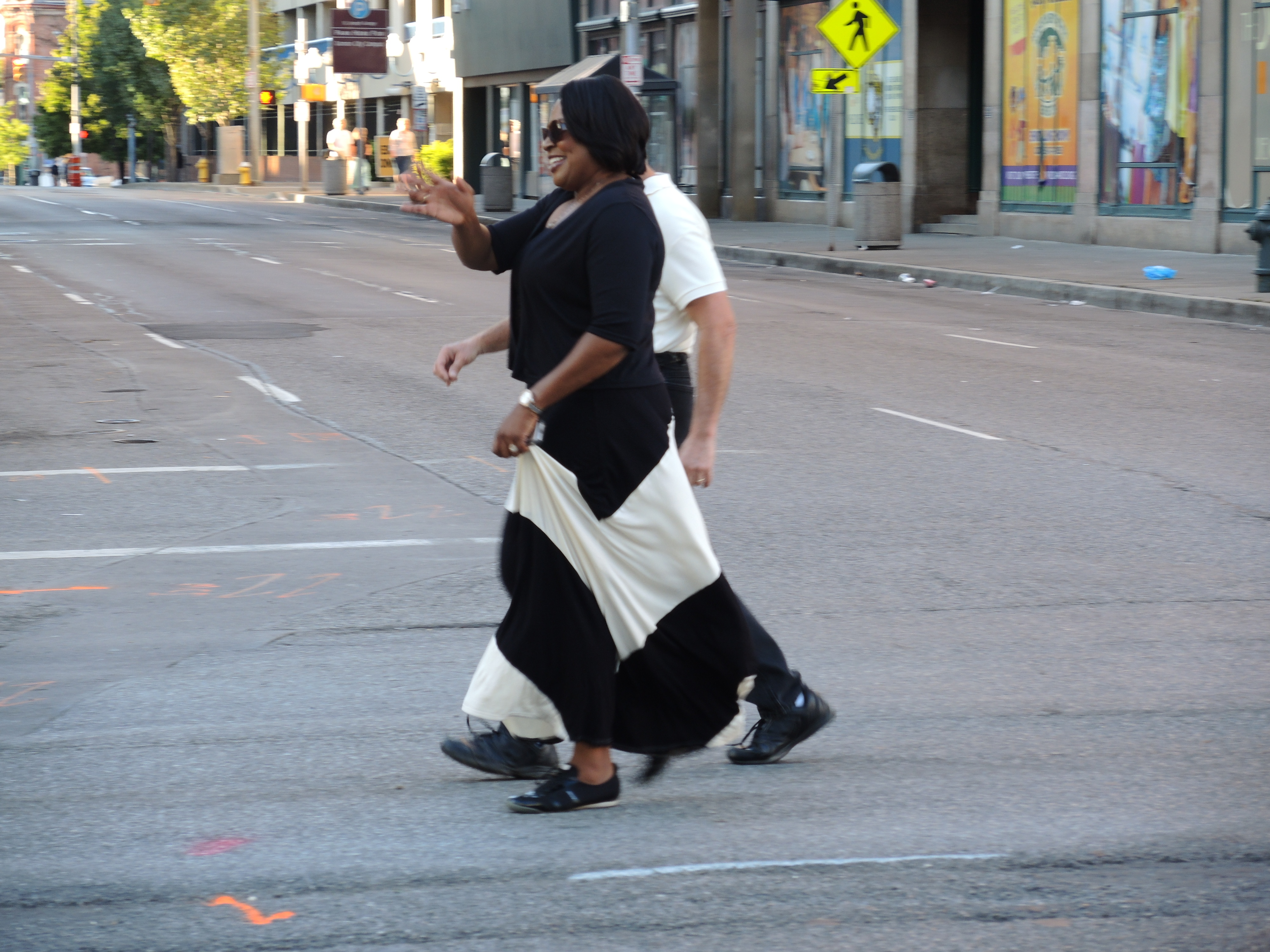
Warren in the 2014 Labor Day Parade

Warren was sworn in as Rochester's 69th mayor on January 1, 2014. She began her second term on January 1, 2018, after winning re-election in 2017.

While in office, Warren identified job creation, safer neighborhoods, and improved educational opportunities as priorities for her administration. Her administration also oversaw the Inner Loop East project, begun under the Richards administration, which filled in the eastern section of the Inner Loop expressway, converted it into an at-grade street and created land for redevelopment.

Warren launched or supported several strategic initiatives, including Kiva Rochester, a vanpool program, support for ride-sharing services such as Uber and Lyft, and OWN Rochester, a market-driven community cooperative effort.

The Warren administration also oversaw investment in Rochester's public infrastructure, including road reconstruction, water system upgrades and neighborhood improvement projects. In 2021, she announced that Rochester would receive nearly $12 million in state funding for local road repairs and maintenance as part of the New York State 2021–2022 budget.

The administration also supported efforts to attract new business investment and redevelopment projects in Rochester. In 2021, Constellation Brands announced that it would relocate its corporate headquarters from Victor, New York, to downtown Rochester; Spectrum News reported that the project involved about $50 million in investment, about 340 jobs moved to the city and about 80 new jobs.

Under Warren's direction, the Rochester Police Department underwent a reorganization to implement a neighborhood-based patrol model that converted the patrol structure from two Patrol Divisions, each covering half of the city, to five smaller Patrol Sections. The RPD also implemented a body-worn video program during Warren's first term.

Warren convened an early learning council to help expand pre-kindergarten programs in the city. She also developed a "3 to 3 Initiative" to help three-year-old children get on a path to read at grade level by third grade. To help achieve these goals, she eliminated fines for children's books and materials at city libraries.

In December 2016, Warren ended the city's red light camera program. The insurance industry objected to such cancellations, citing studies by the Insurance Institute for Highway Safety that found cities using red-light cameras had fewer fatal red-light-running crashes than cities that had ended such programs. Warren said the benefits did not justify extending Rochester's program and cited concerns that many tickets were issued to residents in zip codes with high poverty rates.

Though designated as an elector in the 2020 presidential election, New York Assembly Majority Leader Crystal Peoples-Stokes served as her alternate.

On June 22, 2021, Warren lost the Democratic primary to Rochester City Councilman Malik Evans, conceding the race to Evans later that night. As part of a plea agreement resolving campaign finance and separate firearm-related charges, Warren formally stepped down as mayor on December 1, 2021, with deputy mayor James Smith serving as acting mayor until Evans was inaugurated on January 1, 2022. Shortly before leaving office, Warren submitted a proposal for a guaranteed basic income pilot program for impoverished families in the city.

=== Controversies and legal issues ===
==== Facebook account suspension ====
Warren's Facebook account was temporarily suspended on December 22, 2014, after images of a chat log circulated online and on social media.

==== Campaign finance case ====
Following the 2017 Rochester mayoral election, in which two of Warren's primary opponents filed separate complaints, the New York State Board of Elections investigated allegations involving Warren's campaign and a political action committee. Local media reported that Warren's lawyer denied wrongdoing.

In October 2020, Warren was indicted on two felony charges related to campaign finance rules during her 2017 reelection campaign. She pleaded not guilty.

On October 4, 2021, Warren and two co-defendants pleaded guilty to a misdemeanor charge of accepting campaign contributions that exceeded legal limits. The plea agreement also resolved separate firearm-related charges against Warren and required her resignation as mayor by December 1, 2021.

==== Death of Daniel Prude ====
Warren faced public criticism after the March 2020 death of Daniel Prude following an encounter with Rochester police and after the circumstances of Prude's death became public later that year. A report commissioned by the Rochester City Council faulted Warren and former Rochester Police Chief La'Ron Singletary for keeping critical details about Prude's death from the public for months and said some public statements by city officials were untrue.

==== Husband's arrest and related charges ====
On May 19, 2021, the New York State Police served a warrant at Warren's home as part of a wiretap investigation related to an alleged mid-level narcotics ring. Warren's husband, Timothy Granison, was arrested and accused by authorities of involvement in the operation. Authorities said that seven other homes were searched and that six other people were charged. WHAM reported that the searches yielded more than two kilograms of crack and powdered cocaine, several firearms and more than $100,000 in cash.

Granison was arraigned on drug and weapons charges and pleaded not guilty. The Associated Press reported that Warren was not charged in the narcotics case. Monroe County District Attorney Sandra Doorley said the narcotics investigation was separate from Warren's campaign finance case and denied that the investigation was politically motivated.

In June 2021, prosecutors brought additional drug charges against Granison. Warren said she and Granison had signed a separation agreement years earlier and were co-parenting their daughter.

Although Warren was not charged with drug possession, she and Granison were indicted in July 2021 on charges stemming from the search, including a felony firearm charge and misdemeanor child-endangerment and unsecured-gun charges. Both pleaded not guilty. Warren's charges in this case were resolved as part of the plea agreement involving her campaign finance case.

The Associated Press also reported that questions about Granison's involvement in a 1997 robbery case, when he was a teenager, had surfaced during the 2013 Rochester mayoral election.

== Later career ==
After leaving office in December 2021, Warren returned to legal practice in Rochester. In December 2022, she filed paperwork with the Monroe County Clerk's Office to establish the Law Office of Lovely A. Warren. The firm's website states that she opened the practice in 2022.

In 2024, Warren ran for Rochester City Court judge in the Democratic primary. She lost the primary to Michael Geraci, who received 53.6 percent of the vote to Warren's 46.3 percent.

== Personal life ==
Warren and her husband Timothy Granison have one daughter together. Following Granison's arrest on drug and weapons charges in 2021, Warren stated that she and Granison had been legally separated for several years. At a press conference, Warren questioned the timing of the search shortly before early voting in the mayoral primary and said the charges did not implicate her.

Political offices
| Preceded by Tom Richards | Mayor of Rochester, NY; January 1, 2014 – December 1, 2021 | Succeeded by James Smith |
