= Killing of Daniel Prude =

Death of a Black man in Rochester Police custody

- Rochester police officers placing a spit hood over Prude's head.
- Date: March 23, 2020 (incident); March 30, 2020 (Prude declared dead)
- Time: 3:16 – 3:27 a.m. EDT
- Location: Rochester, New York, U.S.
- Cause: Complications of asphyxia
- Filmed by: Officer Mark Vaughn's body cam
- Participants: Daniel Prude (deceased); Rochester Police Department officers
- Outcome: Prude declared brain dead, taken off life support.

On March 23, 2020, Daniel Prude, a 41-year-old African-American man, died after being physically restrained by Rochester, New York police officers. Prude had been suffering from a mental health episode after ingesting PCP and left his brother's house in a disturbed and naked state. His brother called the police, which then led to the encounter with law enforcement in the street outside of his brother's house. The officers put a spit hood over his head after he began spitting. They restrained him face-down on the street for two minutes and fifteen seconds, and he stopped breathing. Prude received CPR on the scene and later died of complications from asphyxia after being taken off life support.

The autopsy report ruled Prude's death a homicide and also included the contributing factors to his death as "excited delirium and acute intoxication by phencyclidine, or PCP". The death first received attention in September 2020 when the police body camera video and written reports were released along with the autopsy report. Following the report's release, protesters demonstrated outside the Rochester police headquarters and many considered the death to be related to Prude's race. The demonstrations were connected to the Black Lives Matter movement and the string of racial justice events of 2020.

On February 23, 2021, New York Attorney General Letitia James announced that the empaneled grand jury declined to charge the seven officers involved in Prude's death. The same day, the US Attorney's office for the Western District of New York announced they will review the AG report and other evidence, and rule whether a federal response is warranted.

== Arrest and death ==
Daniel T. Prude (September 20, 1978 – March 30, 2020) arrived in Rochester, New York, from Chicago on March 22, 2020, to visit his older brother, Joe Prude. Daniel acted erratically upon his arrival, jumping headfirst down a flight of stairs. His brother dialed emergency services for help. Daniel received a mental health evaluation at Strong Memorial Hospital and was released that night. Within several hours, Daniel resumed his erratic behavior and fled his brother's house around 3 a.m. His brother called emergency services again for assistance. Prude shed his long underwear, tank top, and socks while on the street. A passerby recorded a Facebook Live video of Prude after he begged someone to call emergency services, but Prude ran away when the person called.

At 3:16 a.m., multiple officers and two emergency medical technicians arrived at Prude's location in southwest Rochester, where he was walking naked and bleeding. One officer exited his car and approached Prude, pointing a taser at him while asking him six times to get on the ground. Prude complied and was then asked by the officer to put his hands behind his back, to which he also complied. During the arrest, he said, "Yes, sir" several times to the officer. While handcuffed and on the ground, Prude repeatedly said, "In Jesus Christ I pray, amen", among various other comments.

At around 3:19 a.m., Prude became agitated, spitting at officers, and yelling, "Give me that gun", until one officer placed a spit hood over Prude's head. Prude demanded that they remove it. One minute later, Prude unsuccessfully attempted to stand up before being repeatedly pushed over by officers, who forcibly held him down for approximately two minutes and 15 seconds. Officer Mark Vaughn used his body weight and both hands to press the side of Prude's head to the pavement. Vaughn's report called this a "hypoglossal nerve technique" which, according to USA Today, "involves jamming fingers into a nerve below the jaw to cause pain and persuade a subject to comply". Officer Troy Taladay applied his knee to Prude's back. Another officer held Prude's legs. At the start of the hold, Prude said, "You're trying to kill me." The officers noticed liquid coming from Prude's mouth as he stopped speaking and moving. As Vaughn released his hold, he said "You good now?" Prude did not respond. Vaughn then pushed on his head with one hand for 45 seconds while the attending officers chatted. Three minutes and ten seconds after the restraint began, one police officer remarked that he had been vomiting during the restraint and his chest appeared to have stopped moving. The Associated Press reported that police leaders pressed Rochester to keep the video of Prude's death secret, fearing a "violent blowback" if the video came out during the nationwide George Floyd protests.

An emergency medical technician asked the officers to turn Prude on his back. Acknowledging that Prude was unresponsive, he instructed an officer to apply CPR, who did so. At 3:27 a.m., Prude was placed into an ambulance. While in transport to Strong Memorial Hospital, his heartbeat resumed, but he remained incapacitated from lack of oxygen and was later declared brain dead. He was taken off life support a week after the arrest, on March 30.

The medical examiner's autopsy report ruled Prude's death a homicide as a result of "complications of asphyxia in the setting of physical restraint". The report found contributing factors included "excited delirium and acute intoxication by phencyclidine, or PCP". The report did not mention prior mental health issues or explain the link between the toxicology test and his behavior. Prude's sister claimed Prude smoked a PCP-laced joint at a party prior to his erratic behavior. She sent him to visit their brother when he began acting erratically.

Letitia James, the Attorney General of New York, said Prude's death was being investigated. Governor Andrew Cuomo said on September 2, 2020, that he had originally asked James to investigate the case in July, and that it had been under investigation "for months" prior to September. Rochester police paused its investigation when the state took up the case in April, as the Attorney General's office investigates deaths of unarmed people in police custody rather than having them handled locally. Rochester Mayor Lovely Warren said that the city could not be involved in the case until the state investigation finished.

On August 20, the family's lawyer, Elliot Dolby-Shields, received 88 minutes of body camera recordings following an open records request. The video contains one brief gap but, according to the Rochester Democrat and Chronicle, appears to show the 11-minute incident in full. The newspaper said that the video showed no physical resistance from Prude and no overtly hostile actions from the officers. Shields said that the family "will sue everyone who is responsible for Daniel Prude's death" during a news conference on September 2.

== Reactions ==
Prude's death originally gained notoriety following a press conference on September 2, 2020, which highlighted the body camera video evidence of his death. It was the first public mentioning of the incident. During the conference, Joe Prude, Daniel's brother, denounced his death as a "coldblooded murder", asking, "How many more brothers got to die for society to understand that this needs to stop?"

During a later press conference, Rochester's chief of police claimed that the delay in releasing video evidence "was not a cover-up" and that he understood the frustration towards Prude's death. New York Attorney General Letitia James called it a "tragedy". The Mayor of Rochester, Lovely Warren, said during the same conference that she was "very disturbed" by the footage of his death, but added, "This is not something that's...in our control at this moment in time." Governor Andrew Cuomo similarly called the video "very disturbing".

The Rochester Democrat and Chronicle likened the circumstances to that of George Floyd's murder, which happened two months after Prude's death, and led to national protests.

The December 10, 2020, issue of the New England Journal of Medicine contained an essay in its Points of View section by David A. Paul, M.D., entitled "The Death of Daniel Prude – Reflections of a Black Neurosurgeon". Dr. Paul, who also lived in Rochester, learned after Prude's death that they had been cousins.

== Subsequent protests ==
=== First week ===
On September 2, 2020, in response to the video footage release and subsequent press conference, protesters demonstrated outside the City Public Safety Building (PSB), the department headquarters. Several protesters were arrested and released with appearance summons for entering the headquarters, several attempting to attend a press conference held by the Mayor.

Rochester police made another round of arrests during protests the following day that, at times, turned violent. Protesters gathered and chanted near the Public Safety Building, and tensions began rising around 10:30 p.m. with police deploying pepper spray and pepper balls multiple times in a 10-minute span. Some protesters threw rocks and bottles, with some removing and pushing back a protective fence set up outside of the building. Police moved crowds back away from the building, and later south on Exchange Boulevard, into the Corn Hill neighborhood.

On September 4, 2020, protests began peacefully but ended with authorities dispersing crowds with tear gas and pepper balls following incidents of vandalism and violence, according to officials. Protesters started at Martin Luther King Jr. Park in Downtown Rochester and arrived to a blockade set up across the Court Street Bridge by police, one block from the Safety Building. Bottles and fireworks were launched at police by protesters. Police slowly pushed the crowd several blocks down Court Street. Rochester police arrested 11 people during the outbreaks of violence, the department said. According to police, three officers were hurt and were hospitalized but later released.

On September 5, 2020, the fourth night of protests over the death of Prude was the largest yet, and again ended with pepper balls, tear gas and fireworks. Protesters marched from Jefferson Ave to City Hall, and next to Exchange Blvd at Broad Street, to a police roadblock outside of the Blue Cross Arena, north of the Safety Building. Six minutes after arriving, after some threw water bottles, police began dispensing crowds with tear gas, pepper spray, flash bangs and an LRAD. At least one protester launched multiple fireworks at officers from then on that night.

Police continued pushing protesters north on Exchange Blvd—which continues north of W. Main Street as State Street—also dispersing a re-assembling crowd in front of City Hall. While most demonstrators left downtown quickly, several hundred remained on State Street for another hour or so. Several dozen stayed until about 1:30 am the next day, pushed 1/2 mile (800 m) north of the roadblock to outside of Kodak Tower, before officers in squad cars finally dispersed the remaining people. Two U-Haul trucks were set on fire in a parking lot nearby before firefighters extinguished them.

Rochester police arrested nine people, including two on felony charges. Three officers were also treated at the hospital for injuries. No official account of injuries to protesters was offered.

On September 6, 2020, roughly 1,000 people came out to protest on the fifth day, which was the first peaceful night since protests started. Rochester police reported no arrests after demonstrators descended on the city's Public Safety Building, a day after nearby demonstrations resulted in numerous clashes between protesters and police. The police presence that night was noticeably subdued, with fewer visible officers outside of the building, and a relaxed perimeter more similar to that as on September 3. The march also used "elders", namely older, respected community members to stand between the police and protesters, to both prevent and reduce the odds of a clash that night. The demonstration came hours after Mayor Lovely Warren and the city's police chief La'Ron Singletary called for calm following tense protests the previous day.

=== Second week ===
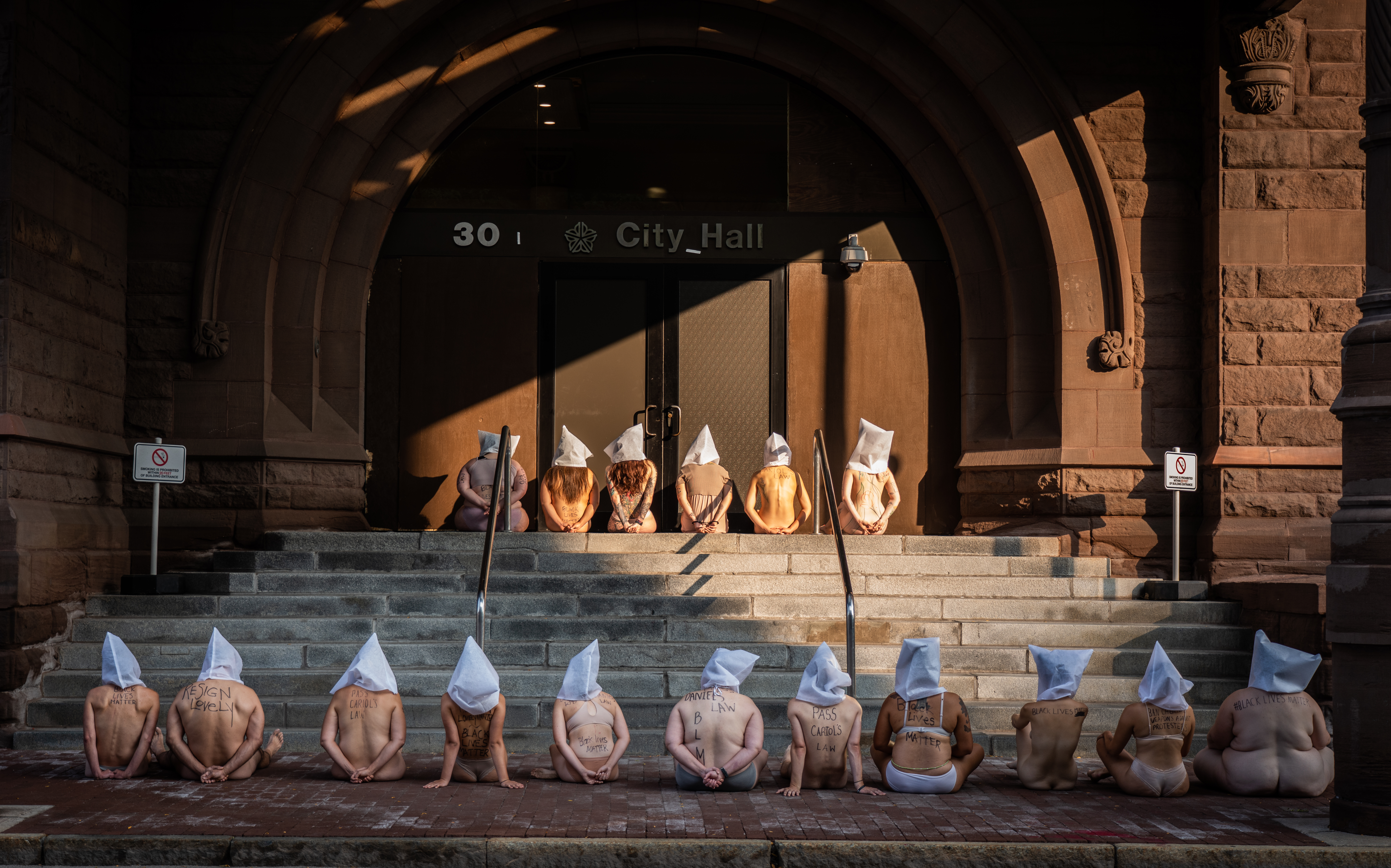
Protesters sit naked in front of Rochester City Hall on September 10, 2020

On September 7, 2020, six naked or partially naked demonstrators sat silently outside of the Public Safety Building that morning. All had their hands behind their backs and wore spit hoods, in a reference to Prude. That night, 600–1000 people demonstrated on the sixth day of protests. Demonstrators started at Martin Luther King Jr. park and again marched to Rochester City Hall, followed by the Public Safety Building. The events were mostly peaceful, although a tense standoff between officers and protesters occurred. The police presence was initially relaxed, but changed after demonstrators became more agitated one hour after arriving at the Safety Building. Some threw bottles at police and started removing the first layer of barricades, after which an unlawful assembly was declared and dozens of officers moved in position to disperse crowds. Police remained in the same position, not forcing crowds back or using any tear gas or pepper spray that night as had previously occurred. The last protesters left without incident around 1 am.

On September 8, 2020, protesters demonstrated for the seventh straight day, which ended peacefully for a third consecutive night. It came hours after Police Chief Singletary and his entire command staff (six other officials) either retired, announced intentions to retire or were demoted to their previously held positions. Protesters started on Jefferson Avenue, walked and demonstrated at the Public Safety Building and later outside of City Hall. Protesters also painted "Black Lives Matter" on Jefferson Ave, "Murderers" on Exchange Boulevard in front of the Safety Building, and "Resign" on Church Street facing City Hall.

On September 9, 2020, two men who allegedly attacked police officers in Rochester during the protest on September 5 were arrested. The Justice Department announced criminal charges against two people for civil disorder during the demonstration four days before.

Protesters again sat naked or partially naked in front of City Hall on September 10, 2020. More than a dozen people were wearing mesh hoods.
