= William A. Johnson Jr. =

American politician

William Johnson
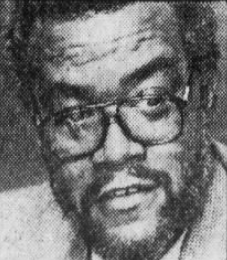

64th Mayor of Rochester
- In office January 1, 1994 – December 31, 2005
- Preceded by: Thomas Ryan
- Succeeded by: Robert Duffy

Personal details
- Born: August 22, 1942 (age 84) Lynchburg, Virginia, U.S.
- Party: Democratic
- Education: Howard University (BA, MA)

William A. Johnson Jr. (born August 22, 1942) is an American politician who served as the 64th Mayor of the City of Rochester, New York. He was the first African-American mayor in the city's history.

== Early life and education ==
Johnson is a native of Lynchburg, Virginia. He earned a B.A. and M.A. in Political Science from Howard University in 1965 and 1967, respectively. He then moved to Flint, Michigan, where he worked at Mott Community College and the Flint Urban League. He married Sylvia Andrews McCoy Johnson, Esq., and in 1972 moved to Rochester, New York.

== Career ==
Prior to his election as mayor, Johnson served for 21 years as the President and Chief Executive Officer of the Urban League of Rochester, responsible for developing and overseeing programs and projects in education, youth development, family services, employment training and affordable housing. Under his tenure, the league expanded its expenditures and increased the number of community programs.

=== Mayor of Rochester ===
Johnson first entered politics when he ran for Mayor of Rochester in 1993 as a Democrat. In the Democratic primary, he defeated County Legislator Kevin Murray and former City Councilmember Ruth Scott. He received over 72 percent of the vote in the November general election to succeed 20-year incumbent Thomas Ryan. Johnson was the city's first African-American mayor. In November 1997, Johnson was re-elected without opposition. In November 2001, he was re-elected to a third term with over 78 percent of the vote. Johnson announced during that campaign that he would not seek a fourth term.

Johnson faced several challenges as mayor, including a declining population, shrinking tax base, rising demand for social services and a high violent crime rate. He became known for his willingness to take risks for city improvement. He introduced a number of innovative programs as mayor, including the Neighbors Building Neighborhoods Program to allow citizen involvement in community planning and the creation of Neighborhood Empowerment Teams and a Community Oriented Policing program to allow citizen input on policing and encourage collaboration between the Rochester Police Department and residents. In 1998, the city implemented the Rochester 2010 Plan, a long-term urban planning blueprint based on proposals from residents, and in 2002, the city's zoning code was overhauled. The Rochester International Jazz Festival was first held in 2002 with Johnson's support. Rochester's fiscal health and credit rating remained strong under his tenure, despite the loss of tax revenue.

Other projects Johnson supported were less successful. Johnson spearheaded the Spirit of Ontario I fast ferry service between Rochester and Toronto. First approved in 2001, the fast ferry service began in 2004 but was plagued by numerous operational and financial issues, stopping service multiple times, and losing millions of dollars. The ferry's terminal building in Charlotte, which still stands today, was named after Johnson in 2018. This was seen as an "insult" to his legacy by arch-conservative journalist Bob Lonsberry. Despite large amounts of public investment, the city also failed to attract new businesses during his tenure.

In 1999, Johnson was named the United States' Local Public Official of the Year by Governing Magazine. In 2004, he was a finalist for the World Mayor Prize.

Johnson retired as mayor in 2005 and became a professor at the Rochester Institute of Technology. Johnson's successor Robert Duffy undid many of the changes he had introduced. The ferry was shut down in 2006, with the city selling the Spirit of Ontario in 2007. Programs for citizen engagement were shut down, and community policing was replaced with a zero-tolerance policing strategy.

=== Other political ventures ===
In 2003, Johnson ran unsuccessfully for Monroe County Executive on a platform of fiscal responsibility and regional cooperation and innovation. In 2011, after a tumultuous period in which the City of Rochester had three different mayors in three weeks after having only three mayors in the previous thirty-seven years, Johnson ran again for Mayor in a special election to serve the remainder of the term of Robert Duffy, who resigned. As the Independence Party of New York and Working Families Party candidate, Johnson lost to Democrat Tom Richards. Johnson garnered more votes than any previous candidate in New York State on the Working Family Party's ticket.

Political offices
Preceded by Thomas Ryan	Mayor of Rochester, NY; 1994 – 2005	Succeeded by Robert Duffy
