= Rochester Police Department =

Police department in Rochester, New York

- Abbreviation: RPD
- Motto: Serving With Pride

Agency overview
- Formed: December 28, 1819
- Preceding agency: Metropolitan Police
- Annual budget: ▼US$ 90.380 Million (2018–2019)

Jurisdictional structure
- Operations jurisdiction: Rochester, New York, USA
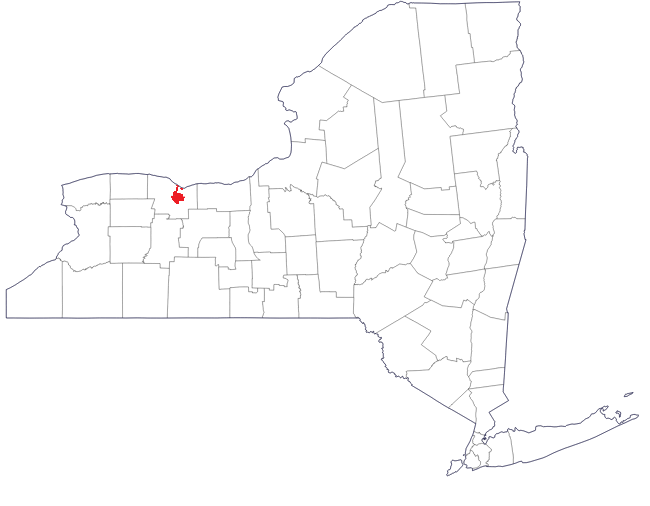
- Map of Rochester Police Department's jurisdiction
- Area: 37 square miles (96 km^{2})
- Population: 230,000
- Legal jurisdiction: As per operations jurisdiction
- Primary governing body: Mayor of Rochester, New York
- Secondary governing body: Rochester City Council
- General nature: Local civilian police

Operational structure
- Headquarters: 185 Exchange Boulevard, Rochester
- Police Officers: ▼620 of 720 (2024)
- Unsworn members: ▼124 (2018–2019)
- Agency executive: David Smith, Chief of Department
- Units: Patrol Division East; Patrol Division West; Special Operations Division

Facilities
- Stations: Headquarters; Patrol Division East; Patrol Division West; Animal Control Center; Special Operations Division

Website
- www.cityofrochester.gov/police

The Rochester Police Department, also known as the RPD, is the principal law enforcement agency of the City of Rochester, New York, reporting to the city mayor. It currently has approximately 852 officers and support staff, a budget of approximately $90 million, and covers an area of 37 square miles (96 km^{2}). The Rochester Police Department has been under a court-ordered federal consent decree from the United States Department of Justice since 1975 over its hiring practices. The decree was part of a 1975 settlement involving racial discrimination.

== History ==
Rochester hired a constable and formed a nightwatch, which first went active on December 28, 1819. Addy Van Slyck was hired as the first police chief in 1853. The police department was reorganized into the Metropolitan Police in 1865.

RPD was the first department in New York State to adopt a police telegraph system in 1886.

In 1893, the department established a bicycle division consisting of two officers who apprehended a daily average of 25 "scorchers" (speeders). The department fielded a mounted division in 1895—officers were expected to supply their own horses.

In 1905, the department added a traffic bureau consisting of officers stationed at busy Main Street intersections (East Avenue, St. Paul Street, State Street, and Fitzhugh Street). The chief traffic offenders of the time were haywagons. The city installed traffic lights in 1922. The department's first policewoman, Nellie L. McElroy, was also the first to be appointed under civil service rules in New York State.

The department's first African-American officer, Charles Price, was hired in 1947. Price retired in 1985 as a police captain and died on May 17, 2021.

Since the establishment of the Rochester Police Department, 14 officers have died in the line of duty.

=== Police chief goes to jail ===
In October 1990, while serving as chief of police, Gordan Urlacher was arrested in Mayor Thomas Ryan's office on charges of conspiracy and embezzlement. He was dismissed as chief two months later. On February 25, 1992, former Rochester Police Chief Gordon Urlacher was convicted of three counts of embezzlement and one count of conspiracy for stealing police funds between 1988 and 1990 when he was chief of the police. On March 5, 1992, the former chief was sentenced to four years in federal prison for embezzling more than $200,000 in police department funds. Urlacher was also ordered by a federal judge to repay $150,000 to the city and to spend 12 years on supervised probation.

=== Civil rights trial ===
The federal investigation into Chief Urlacher's theft of $300,000 of public funds led to a deeper probing of the entire police department which resulted in charges being brought against 5 additional police officers. The five officers, all members of the vice squad, were accused of beating and terrorizing drugs suspects and skimming drug profits. The 19 counts of police brutality included accusations of the use of unauthorized weapons to beat or threaten suspects, including blackjacks, a cattle prod and lead-filled leather gloves. On December 7, 1992, former Chief, Urlarcher pleaded guilty to the felony conspiracy to violate civil rights admitting that he knew about the civil rights abuses but did nothing about them. During a high-profile 10-week trial 12 officers testified against their 5 colleagues. In the end, the five officers were found not guilty on all charges.

== Controversy and Misconduct ==
=== Civilian review board ===
In 1992 the City of Rochester created a civilian review board to review internal police investigations when a civilian alleges that a police officer used excessive force or committed a crime. The police chief made the final decisions on all complaints.

In 2019, voters approved plans to create a civilian Police Accountability Board that replaced the previous review board. The new nine-member board functions as an independent city office with the purpose of investigating officer misconduct. It has additional resources that its predecessor lacked, such as subpoena power and ability to discipline officers. A New York State Supreme Court ruling in March 2020 struck down the board’s proposed discipline powers after a lawsuit was filed by the Rochester Police Locust Club, the city police union. The City Council filed an appeal of the decision, but no action has occurred yet.

=== Police shootings ===
Police shootings
Shooting victim	Victim's age	Shooting date	Officer(s) involved	Outcome for victim	Outcome for officer
Juliano Anthony Plaza	23	December 15, 2014	Cynthia I. Muratore	Initially in guarded condition, made full recovery and appeared in court.	Later promoted to Investigator
Thomas Johnson III	38	September 3, 2014	Darryl Pierson, Michael DiPaola	Convicted of the murder of 32-year old Daryl R. Pierson, an 8-year veteran of the Rochester Police Department.	Pierson was murdered by Johnson. DiPaola found justified in his actions.
Ralph Strong "Irak"	24	July 27, 2013	Lt. Zenelovic, Charles Gorman, Officers Matt Balch, and Daniel Rizzo	Shot multiple times; survived and convicted of two murders.	Officers praised by Mayor Richardson and Police Chief Shepard for conduct.
Israel "Izzy" Andino	20	June 21, 2012	Sgt. Aaron Colletti, Sgt. Mike Nicholls, Antonio Gonzalez, Brian Cala, Greg Karnes, Onasis Socol, and Eluid Rodriguez	Death	Deemed justified by Grand Jury
Hayden Blackman	43	October 13, 2011	Randy Book	Death	Deemed justified by Grand Jury
Miguel Cruz	21	March 1, 2010	Daniel Santiago	Survived	Deemed justified by Grand Jury
Jose Luis Casado	19	2008	Ryan Hickey	Shot in leg; Sentenced to life in prison for firing at police	Praised by Police Chief David Moore for his conduct.
Patricia Thompson	54	March 2, 2006	Jeffrey J. Lafave	Death	Deemed justified by Grand Jury
LaShedica Mason	13	July 10, 2005	Mark Simmons	Survived; gall bladder and part of her intestine had to be removed.	Promoted to Sergeant and Special Assistant to Chief James Sheppard.
Willie Carter	46	August 15, 2002	n/a	Death	Deemed justified by Grand Jury
Craig Heard	14	June 10, 2002	Serge Savitcheff and Hector Padgham	Death	Padgham goes to Greece, New York Police Department; Savitcheff goes to Fairport, New York Police Department.
Vandre "Vandy" Davis	21	2001	David Gebhardt	Death	Promoted to Lieutenant
Calvin Greene	30	1988	Gary E. Smith	Death	Officer Smith was suspended without pay. Then-Rochester Police Chief Gordon F. Urlacher said departmental charges would be filed against Officer Smith. He declined to specify what the charges would be. Ultimate resolution unclear.
James Geil	24	October 12, 1985	Allen J. Luccitti	Survived	Pleaded guilty to Department use of firearms and was suspended for 31 days.
Louis Davila	17	September 30, 1985	Carlos Perez	Death	Unknown
Kenneth Jackson	25	November 16, 1984	Ceferino Gonzalez	Death	Unknown
Hiawatha Franklin	n/a	May 8, 1979	Harold Dack	Death	Unknown
Denise Hawkins	18	November 11, 1975	Michael Leach	Death	Promoted to Captain
Ronald Frazier	19	1975	James Soles	Death	Unknown
Unidentified "negro motorist"	n/a	July 25, 1967	n/a	Death	Unknown

=== Operation Cool Down ===
In July 2012, the RPD announced Operation Cool Down with the stated purpose to crack down on violence in community. The initiative includes increased police presence in minority neighborhoods with a strategy to target minor offenses.

If you're riding a bike and it doesn't have a bell, we're going to stop you. If it doesn't have lights, we're going to stop you. Tail light's out – we're going to stop you. If you're on a corner and we think you're engaged in criminal activity, we're going to stop you. — Police Chief James Sheppard

Operation Cool Down has prompted a backlash of criticism for racial profiling from residents, the ACLU, and Chair of City Council's Public Safety Committee Adam McFadden.

=== Mass surveillance ===
A May 2012 national study that examined density of traffic cameras, red light cameras, and police surveillance cameras and authorized wiretaps found Rochester, NY to be the fifth most surveilled city in the country. Rochester, NY was found only to be behind Washington, D.C., Houston, Denver, and Cheyenne. The NYCLU among other community groups have questioned the effectiveness of the mass surveillance tactics and whether they invade the privacy of everyday law-abiding civilians. According to Rochester Police, there are more than 100 surveillance cameras and 25 red light cameras throughout the city as of May 2012.

=== Obstructing video recording of police ===
On numerous occasions civilians have accused Rochester police of intimidating and/or arresting them for legally videotaping police officers in public. Most notable instance was the Emily Good incident.

In May 2011, Emily Good was arrested in her front lawn for videotaping a suspicious traffic stop in front of her house. After the video of the police interaction and arrest was posted on YouTube, it immediately went viral and attain sustained local, national, and international media coverage. Good was charged with Obstructing Governmental Administration but after the video was released the Monroe County District Attorney withdrew the charge.

=== Riot gear at Puerto Rican Festival ===
Starting in at least 2004, Rochester Police have come under criticism by their now common practice showing up in riot gear after the Puerto Rican festival. In 2007, festival organizer Ida Perez called the police response "overkill." While many festival goers say honking, dancing, and street partying is all in good fun, police say riot gear is necessary to clear out the neighborhood.

=== 2009 peace march ===
On October 7, 2009, the eighth anniversary of the start of the Afghanistan war, the Rochester police broke up a peace march protesting the Afghanistan war organized by Rochester Students for a Democratic Society with a massive police response which included at least 40 police. In the end twelve people were arrested, two were hospitalized for their injuries sustained from police. The severe police response drew massive public outcry. Executive Deputy Police Chief Markert admitted the police could have acted differently to ensure everyone's safety.

20/20 hindsight, would I have loved to say, OK, hold on folks, where are you going, and let me facilitate you getting there in a safe manner, that's me the next day. I don't know why that didn't happen. -Executive Deputy Police Chief George Markert, at a Special Session of City Council

Although Rochester police promised a full report on incident, no report was ever released and it remains unclear if any changes were made in result of the public response or the internal investigation.

=== 2012 anti-capitalist march ===
On July 22, 2012, Rochester police broke up a peaceful anti-capitalist march on East Avenue with pepper spray and 18 arrests. Police were criticized for the large use of pepper spray, not giving dispersal orders, and police brutality. Police claim protesters were blocking the street and refused to move, but videos from the march indicate that many protesters were arrested while walking on the sidewalk.

=== Killing of Daniel Prude ===
The encounter of Daniel Prude with Rochester Police officers on March 23, 2020, and his subsequent death on March 30, sparked intense national criticism of the agency, for a nearly six-month delay in suspending the officers involved, city and department leaders withholding information from the public, and for an aggressive police response to protests.

Officers located a missing Prude—disturbed, naked and in the middle of the street at 3 am—placing him into handcuffs, which he complied to. Prude, suffering from a mental health episode, tries to stand and several officers used restraining techniques to control him. Within several minutes, he goes from fully conscious and alert, to being without a pulse and not breathing. While his heartbeat was restored by paramedics, he was functionally brain-dead, and when disconnected from life support one week later, pronounced dead. The Monroe County Medical Examiner ruled his death a homicide, with "complications from asphyxia in the setting of physical restraint", excited delirium and PCP intoxication listed as factors.

On September 2, the Prude family and their attorneys publicly announced Daniel Prude's death and released obtained body-camera footage that depicted the events of March 23. Police never disclosed or publicly acknowledged the event until after his family did so. Police Chief La'Ron Singletary strongly denied any cover-up by Rochester Police.

Officers involved in Prude's death were suspended with pay, as required by law, by the Mayor on September 4. On September 5, New York State Attorney General Leticia James announced creation of a grand jury to investigate his death.

Protests started on September 2, and continued many days afterwards. Police repeatedly clashed with protesters, facing further scrutiny for crowd control tactics used on multiple nights that escalated tensions. City Hall, the Public Safety Building, and two police substations have been locations of marches and protests.

Protesters marched and assembled at police barricades surrounding city buildings the evenings of Sept 2 through the 5th. Crowds were dispersed multiple nights in a row through use of tear gas, pepper spray, pepper balls, an LRAD and flash bangs after some in the crowds threw objects including rocks, fireworks and water bottles at officers.

The protest organizers have repeatedly called for the resignation of Police Chief La'Ron Singletary, who initially refused; and Mayor Lovely Warren. Protesters demanded that involved officers be fired, criminally prosecuted, and barred from future police employment.

On September 8, Police Chief Singletary and the entire command staff announced their retirements from their police department positions. Singletary was then fired by Mayor Lovely Warren on September 14, prior to his planned departure on Sept 29. Three Deputy Police Chiefs departed, one retiring, the other two returning to their previous ranks as Lieutenant and Captain. Two Commanders also departed, one retiring and one returning to previous rank of Lieutenant.

A grand jury declined to issue any indictments against the seven officers involved in Daniel Prude’s death, after being announced by Attorney General Leticia James on February 23. James said that although she respects the grand jury decision, she was extremely disappointed, feeling there was sufficient evidence for officers to be charged following an investigation by her office. She noted several recommendations for changes in state law and department policy, regarding police response to mental health calls, de-escalation training for officers, and the use of spit hood alternatives.

=== January 2021 Avenue B incident ===
On January 29, 2021, Rochester police responding to a domestic dispute found a 9-year-old girl in crisis. They handcuffed her and one of them told her that she's "acting like a child", to which the girl responded that she actually is a child. Officers then placed the girl in a squad car and pepper-sprayed her while she was still handcuffed. Initially, 17 minutes of bodycam footage of the incident were released on January 31, 2021, but on February 4, 2021, more videos were released, showing all the angles of the incident. In this compilation, an officer can be heard saying, "You did it to yourself, hon.", about a minute after the girl was pepper-sprayed. After that, in February 2021, the mother of the pepper-sprayed girl, Elba Pope, filed a lawsuit against the Rochester Police Department, to which government replied with a 15-day suspension to officer Alexander Lombard (born 1993) and administrative leave for officers Adam K. Bradstreet (born 1988) and Hannah Schneeberger (born 1994). The case caused a widespread outrage all over the area.

=== Handcuffing of EMT ===
On July 11, 2022, RPD investigator Charles LoTempio was involved in an incident with Monroe Ambulance's emergency medical technician Lekia Smith at Strong Memorial Hospital in Rochester. WHEC-TV reported that the incident arose from the investigator parking his unmarked police car in the ambulance bay in front of the emergency room of the hospital, which was followed by the EMT opening her ambulance door to unload a patient from the ambulance, causing the ambulance door to hit the police car. WHEC-TV further reported that when the investigator asked the EMT to identify herself, the EMT insisted on bringing her patient into the hospital before doing so. Surveillance footage showed that the EMT had brought the patient into the hospital and was checking in the patient at the check-in desk, which was followed by the investigator pushing the EMT against the desk, handcuffing her and bringing her out of the hospital. Body camera video then showed the investigator putting the handcuffed EMT in his police car, where she remained for twenty minutes; during this time the investigator told the EMT: "How was I abusing my power? You got to give me your license when the police tell you, if you don’t, you get arrested." Ultimately, the investigator uncuffed and released the EMT, and no charges were filed against the EMT. The EMT suffered minor injuries as a result of the incident.

As a result of the incident, the investigator was first placed on administrative duty, and later on July 18, RPD announced that the investigator had been suspended with pay, pending investigation. The police union of Rochester criticized the suspension, claiming that the incident "reached a mutually acceptable resolution that day" when "both accepted each other’s explanations" for their actions; the EMT's lawyer responded that the union was providing a "jaw-dropping" lie as the investigator and EMT "never came to any agreement". RPD investigated the incident and found that LoTempio violated RPD rules and regulations.

A Rochester Democrat and Chronicle review of records showed that RPD investigator Charles LoTempio received a 30-day suspension for excessive force and submitting an erroneous report in 2013, when he struck a handcuffed suspect with a metal flashlight, and failed to report that this strike occurred because LoTempio was trying to punch the suspect's chin. It also showed that LoTempio was officially reprimanded for conducting a strip search on a suspect without a warrant in 2012, while also receiving a note on his record that he committed a "failure to execute a command order" in 2012. LoTempio has also been sued fives times in federal court over alleged misconduct.

=== Officer sentenced for rape and forcible touching ===
In 2023, Rochester police officer Shawn Jordan was arrested and charged with allegedly exposing himself to a 16-year-old girl in an online video chat. The department suspended him without pay the same day. In a separate case, Jordan admitted to having had sex with a 13-year-old girl in 2022. He pled guilty to rape and forcible touching. He was sentenced to 10 weekends in jail, and 10 years of probation. The victim's mother said that Jordan "ruined her daughter's life."

== Organization ==
The department is organized into two bureaus: Operations and Administration.

=== Operations Bureau ===
The Operations Bureau consists of two divisions:

- Patrol Division
- Special Operations Division

The Patrol Divisions primarily conduct foot, bicycle, and vehicle patrols and respond to emergency calls, apprehending suspects and conducting preliminary and follow-up investigation of offenses. They also work closely with Police and Citizens Together Against Crime Program (PAC-TAC) participants and Police-Citizen Interaction Committees (PCIC) and participate in the City's four Neighborhood and Business Development (NBD) teams. In 2013, the Patrol Division was reorganized into five sections - Lake Section, Genesee Section, Goodman Section, Clinton Section, and Central Section.

The Special Operations Division is considerably more specialized, consisting of:

- City Security
- Bomb Squad
- Emergency Task Force (ETF), known in other departments as SWAT, is responsible for incidents such as hostage rescue, barricaded gunman, high-risk warrant service, VIP protection and any other mission assigned by the Chief of Police.
- Emotionally Disturbed Person Response Team (EDPRT) is a 50 Member Team: A group of employees specially trained, on a voluntary basis, to deal with emotionally disturbed individuals in a variety of situations in the Rochester community. These situations may include suicidal persons, persons exhibiting irrational behavior, handling psychiatric patients, the homeless, various mental health concerns and/or referrals, and any other situations that deal specifically with the needs of the mental health community and emotionally disturbed persons.
- Hostage Negotiation Team
- Mobile Field Force which provides crowd control
- Mounted Section, which provides equestrian patrols downtown
- SCUBA Squad for drowning and underwater evidence recovery in or on City waterways
- Special Investigation Section (SIS) for combatting drug trafficking, illegal firearms, and organized crime
- Tactical Unit which provides special crime-fighting equipment and targets violent crime patterns. The Tactical Unit focuses specifically on shootings, robberies, and other violent street crimes. The Tactical Unit is often called upon by the Major Crimes Unit to assist in tracking down and apprehending homicide suspects as well as SIS to assist in street level narcotics enforcement.
- Traffic Enforcement Section which provides traffic direction and cites motorists who violate traffic laws, including DWI

=== Administration Bureau ===
The Administration Bureau comprises:

- Family and Victim Services Section
- Personnel Section
- Police Background and Recruitment Unit
- Professional Development Section
- Technical Services Section

== Ranks ==
- Chief
- Assistant Chief
- Commander
- Captain
- Lieutenant
- Sergeant
- (Investigator)
- Police Officer

== Demographics ==
As of February 2010, 85% (744) of the police force were white, 13% (113) black, 11% (94) Latino, and 2% (16) Asian. 76% (672) were men while 24% (209) were women. 85% (753) of the officers were non-residents, while 15% (128) were residents of the city of Rochester.

RPD Demographics
Race	RPD %	City %
White	85%	38%
Black	13%	42%
Latino	11%	16%
Asian	2%	3%
Native American	0%	1%

== Facilities ==
The department's headquarters are in the Public Safety Building at 185 Exchange Boulevard. The Patrol Divisions are located at 630 North Clinton Avenue and 1099 Jay Street. The Animal Control Center is at 184 Verona Street. The Special Operations Division is at 261 Child Street.

== Equipment ==
Officers of the Rochester Police Department were formerly issued the Beretta Px4 Storm in .45 ACP as a service pistol, which itself replaced the Beretta 8045 Cougar.

During the 2010s, RPD officers began being issued Glock 21 Gen4 handguns, as the department switched from the Px4 Storm as its standard issue sidearm. The Glock 21 has demonstrated greater reliability in the field, prompting the transition after trials within the department.

Currently, all patrol officers carry the Glock 21 Gen4, and those in administrative positions can choose between the Glock 21 Gen4 or the Glock 30SF.

== See also ==
- Rochester 1964 race riot
- List of law enforcement agencies in New York
- Monroe County Sheriff's Office (New York)
- Daniel Prude Protests
- 2020 Rochester shooting
