= George Aldridge =

George Aldridge may refer to:

- George Aldridge (boxer) (born 1936), British middleweight boxer
- George Sydney Aldridge (1847–1911), Australian businessman, president of the Adelaide Stock Exchange
- George Washington Aldridge Sr. (1833–1877), New York politician
- George W. Aldridge (1856–1922), Republican politician from New York state
