= George W. Aldridge =

American politician (1856–1922)

George Washington Aldridge II
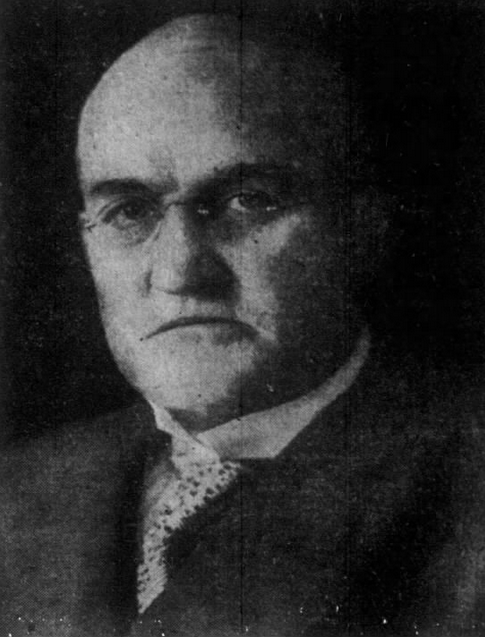

Collector of the Port of New York
- In office May 1, 1921 – June 13, 1922
- President: Warren G. Harding
- Preceded by: Byron R. Newton
- Succeeded by: Henry C. Stuart

New York State Commissioner of Public Works
- In office January 2, 1895 – January 16, 1899
- Preceded by: Edward Hannan
- Succeeded by: John Nelson Partridge

43rd Mayor of Rochester
- In office April 1, 1894 – January 22, 1895
- Preceded by: Richard J. Curran
- Succeeded by: Merton E. Lewis

Personal details
- Born: December 28, 1856 Michigan City, Indiana
- Died: June 13, 1922 (aged 65) Harrison, New York, U.S.
- Party: Republican
- Spouse: Mary Josephine MacNamara
- Children: 1
- Parent: George Washington Aldridge Sr.

George Washington Aldridge II (December 28, 1856 – June 13, 1922) was a prominent politician from New York state. After serving as the Mayor of Rochester, New York, he became the boss of the Republican Party in Rochester and was influential in state politics until his death. At the end of his career, he served as the Collector of the Port of New York during the presidency of Warren G. Harding.

== Early life ==
Aldridge was born on December 28, 1856, in Michigan City, Indiana. As an infant, his parents moved to Rochester, New York, where his father, George Washington Aldridge Sr. (1833–1877), later became the 38th Mayor of Rochester, serving from 1873 to 1874.

He attended public schools in Rochester before attending Cary Collegiate Seminary in Oakfield, New York, and then the De Graf Military Institute in Rochester. He inherited control of a construction firm from the elder George Aldridge and became a leading contractor in the city, which he used to launch his political career.

== Career ==
=== Local politics ===
In 1883, Aldridge was elected to the Executive Board of Rochester and was reelected three times serving over eleven years. In this early part of his political career he had a strong reputation for improving municipal services, including the fire and police departments. Through the management of his father's contacts and patronage in the expanding city government, Aldridge built a powerful machine. He was elected Mayor of Rochester in 1893, and assumed office in April 1894.

=== State politics ===
In 1888, Aldridge became a member of the New York Republican State Committee and soon thereafter was placed on the Executive Committee which he served on until his death.

In January 1895, Aldridge was appointed the Superintendent of Public Works by Governor (and former Vice President of the United States) Levi P. Morton. Aspiring for higher offices in the state, and losing interest in the responsibilities of the mayor's office, he accepted and resigned as mayor on January 22. He served as Superintendent until January 16, 1899. While in office, he sought the Republican nomination to succeed Morton for governor but lost the nomination to U.S. Representative Frank S. Black, who was then elected governor. As commissioner, however, $9,000,000 "passed through his hands and it is of record that his incumbency was marked by gross mismanagement, incompetency and waste of money." Black's successor as governor, Theodore Roosevelt, appointed a commission to investigate Aldridge. No criminal charges resulted, although the report's findings were "not complimentary".

In 1902, Aldridge was appointed the Secretary of the State Railway Commission by Governor Frank W. Higgins and remained on the commission until 1907, eventually becoming Chairman. That year it was replaced by the Public Service Commission under Governor Charles Evans Hughes. Aldridge again sought higher office in 1910 by running in the House election in the 32nd district following the death of incumbent James Breck Perkins. He was defeated by the Democratic candidate, James S. Havens. In 1913, Aldridge became president of the American Cement Corporation, the largest of its kind outside of New York City.

=== Party boss ===
After Merton E. Lewis succeeded Aldridge as acting mayor, a local Good Government League formed to promote an independent school board and other municipal improvements. Aldridge's chosen successor, Hiram Edgerton, lost to Municipal Court Judge George E. Warner, a Democrat, in the 1895 election. Warner was combative with the city council and both parties during his two terms, providing Aldridge with a new opportunity. He allied with the Good Government League that had previously supported Warner, and this alliance greatly influenced the local government and election results until Aldridge's death, with all of his preferred mayoral candidates being elected. Rochester mayors George Carnahan and Adolph J. Rodenbeck received Aldridge's support in 1899 and 1901. In 1903 Aldridge recruited James G. Cutler to follow Rodenbeck, and Hiram Edgerton succeeded Cutler in a second bid for mayor in 1907, after which he served for seven consecutive terms. In 1921, Aldridge recruited local businessman Clarence Van Zandt to run for mayor after Edgerton retired.

Although he lost his bids to become a member of the U.S. Congress or Governor, Aldridge remained a well-known Republican party boss in Rochester and New York state. During the Republican administration of Governor Charles Seymour Whitman, he was a member of Whitman's "Kitchen Cabinet" and was part of a triumvirate, known as the "Big Three" that once ruled the state with Thomas C. Platt (a U.S. Senator and U.S. Representative) and Francis Hendricks (a New York State Assemblyman, Senator and Mayor of Syracuse). The triumvirate later became the "Big Four" of Republican state politics with Aldridge working alongside U.S. Representative William L. Ward, Fred Greiner (veteran of Erie County), and James Wolcott Wadsworth Jr. of Western New York. Aldridge was a delegate to every Republican National Convention between 1896 and 1920. At the 1920 Convention, he nominated his friend, Warren G. Harding, on the first ballot. Harding went on to win the nomination and become president.

Aldridge finally reached federal office when he was nominated for Collector of the Port of New York in 1921 by President Harding. Then-Collector Byron Newton implied the nomination was a quid pro quo, sarcastically commenting "we should all admire a prompt paymaster". Aldridge remained in the role until his death the following year.

== Personal life ==
Aldridge was married to Mary Josephine MacNamara (d. 1935). Mary was the daughter of William MacNamara and Mary (née Ready) MacNamara. Together, they were the parents of one child, George Washington Aldridge III (1890–1934), a 1917 Harvard graduate who served as the Commissioner of Jurors. He married Edith Brooks Hunt of Cambridge, Massachusetts.

Aldridge was a member of the Rochester Historical Society, the Empire State Society, the Sons of the American Revolution, and was a Mason, an Odd Fellow, an Elk, and a Knight of Pythias. He was also a member of the Rochester Club, the Genesee Valley Club, the Rochester Athletic Club, the Rochester Whist Club, the Oak Hill Country Club, the Country Club of Rochester, the Lotos Club, the Lawyers Club and Republicans Club of New York City. He was a member of the Board of Governors of the Society of the Genesee and served as president of the American Clay and Cement Corporation of Rochester, a director of the Lincoln National Bank, a member of the Rochester Municipal Art Commission and the Rochester Chamber of Commerce.

Aldridge died on June 6, 1922, while he was golfing with Charles D. Hilles (chairman of the Republican National Committee), Ralph A. Day (Prohibition Commissioner for New York State), and George Sweeny (president of the Hotel Commodore), at the Westchester Biltmore Country Club in Harrison, New York, near Rye. After a service at the First Presbyterian Church, he was buried alongside his father at Mount Hope Cemetery in Rochester.

Political offices
Preceded by Richard J. Curran	Mayor of Rochester, NY; 1894–1895	Succeeded by Merton E. Lewis
Government offices
Preceded by Byron R. Newton	Collector of the Port of New York; 1921–1922	Succeeded by Henry C. Stuart
