= Holy Sepulchre Cemetery (Rochester, New York) =

Roman Catholic cemetery in Rochester, New York, U.S.

Coordinates: 43°12′46″N 77°38′02″W

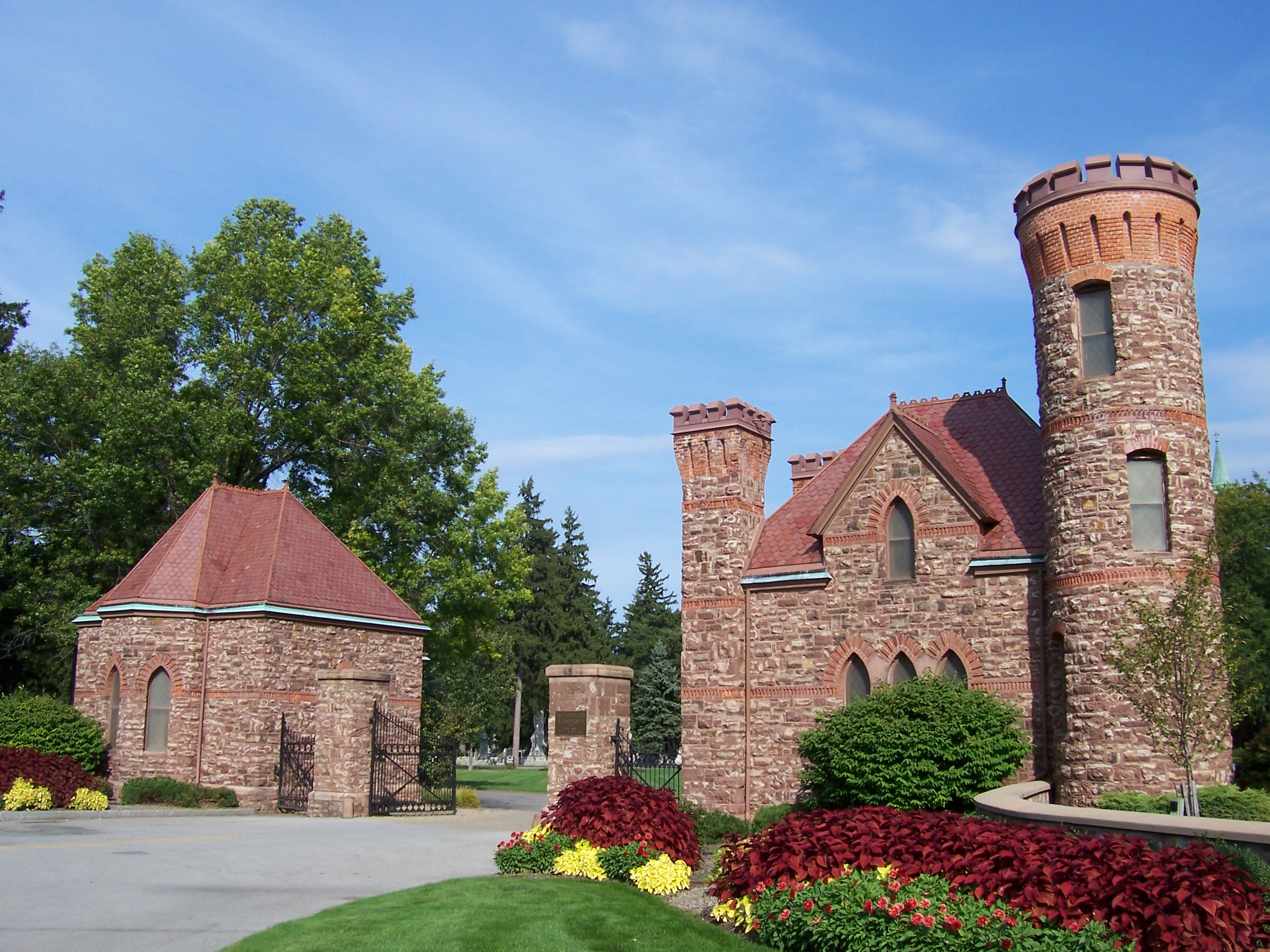
- Holy Sepulchre Cemetery, east division entrance
- Interactive map of Holy Sepulchre Cemetery

Details
- Established: 1871
- Location: Rochester, New York
- Country: United States
- Type: Catholic Public
- Size: 332 acres (1.34 km^{2})
- Website: www.holysepulchre.org
- Find a Grave: Holy Sepulchre Cemetery

Holy Sepulchre Cemetery is a Roman Catholic cemetery in Rochester, New York. Its original parcel was purchased in 1871 under Rochester’s first bishop, the Most Reverend Bernard J. McQuaid. The cemetery’s charter was granted by the State of New York in 1872 and a Board of Trustees was formed with Bishop McQuaid serving as its chairman.

Lake Avenue transects this 332-acre (1.34 km^{2}) cemetery. The west section is located between Dewey Avenue to the west and Lake Avenue to the east. The original east section of the cemetery is situated between the Genesee River to the east and Lake Avenue to the west. The neighboring Riverside Cemetery, operated by the City of Rochester, is also located between the Genesee River and Lake Avenue and is immediately north of Holy Sepulchre’s east section.

== Notable burials ==
- Patrick Barry, co-founder of the Ellwanger & Barry Nursery that helped change Rochester from the "Flour City" to the "Flower City"
- Mabel Boll, socialite known as the "Queen of Diamonds"
- Raymond J. Bowman, United States Army infantryman who served in World War II and the subject of several notable photographs taken by Robert Capa that were published in Life magazine
- Louise Brooks, famous silent film actress
- Assunta Cantisano, co-founder of Ragú
- Richard J. Curran, Mayor of Rochester and Medal of Honor recipient
- Red Dooin, catcher and manager for the Philadelphia Phillies
- James P.B. Duffy, congressman
- Jean Giambrone, Rochester's "First Lady of Sports," the first female to be awarded full press credentials at the Masters Tournament in Augusta, Georgia
- Edward D. Hoch, author of detective fiction
- Chuck Mangione, musician
- Bishop Bernard McQuaid, first Bishop of the Roman Catholic Diocese of Rochester, New York.
- George Mogridge, pitcher for the New York Yankees and Washington Senators and other teams
- Colonel Patrick O'Rorke, civil war hero
- Ralph E. Quattrociocchi, state senator
- Richard Rober, Hollywood actor and native of Rochester
- Francis Tumblety, Jack the Ripper suspect
- Catherine de Valera Wheelwright, mother of Éamon de Valera
- Anna Schumacher, Victim of murder inside Holy Sepulchre Cemetery in 1909. Still unsolved.
- Mike Conroy, a heavyweight boxer who won the Cuban championship, and sparring partner of Gene Tunney.
- Thomas "Scoops" Carey, was a Major League baseball player for the Boston Red Sox from 1934 to 1942.
- Martin Claude Duffy. The first person to be buried at Holy Sepulchre Cemetery in Rochester, NY.
- George Ottmar Mergenthaler, WWII hero who gave his life to save his fellow soldiers.

== All Souls Chapel ==
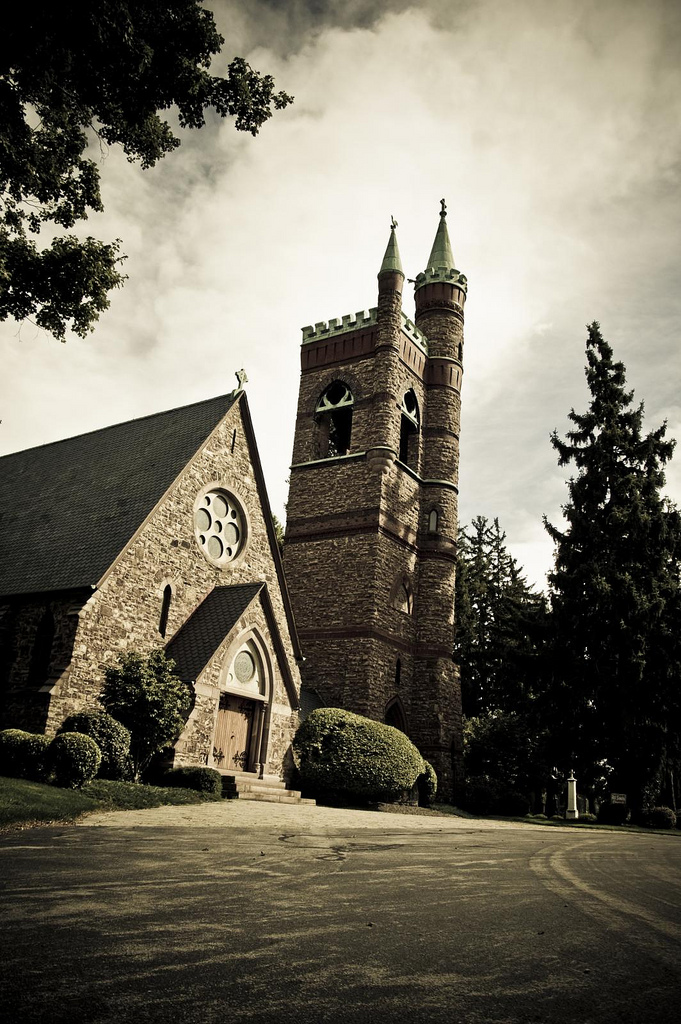
Exterior of All Souls Chapel – Holy Sepulchre Cemetery (Rochester, NY)

All Souls Chapel is an historic chapel located in the east division of Holy Sepulchre Cemetery. Built in 1876, commissioned by Bishop Bernard McQuaid, and designed by Andrew Jackson Warner, this chapel embodies the Early English Gothic style of architecture. It is constructed of Medina sandstone and contains stained glass windows by P. Nicholas of Holland. The interior features ornate hammer beams hand carved by local carpenter Dominic Mura. The altar is a white marble trimmed in black marble and a base of Tennessee pink marble built by the Hall Company of Boston. Several ornate ceiling panels and other intricate adornment throughout the structure was completed by artist Chester F. Leiderson. The lower level of the chapel contains a morgue initially used for storage of bodies that could not be buried when the ground was frozen. In addition, a series of crypts were constructed for the burial of the Bishops of the Roman Catholic Diocese of Rochester, New York.
