= Powers Building =

Historic commercial building in New York, United States

- U.S. National Register of Historic Places
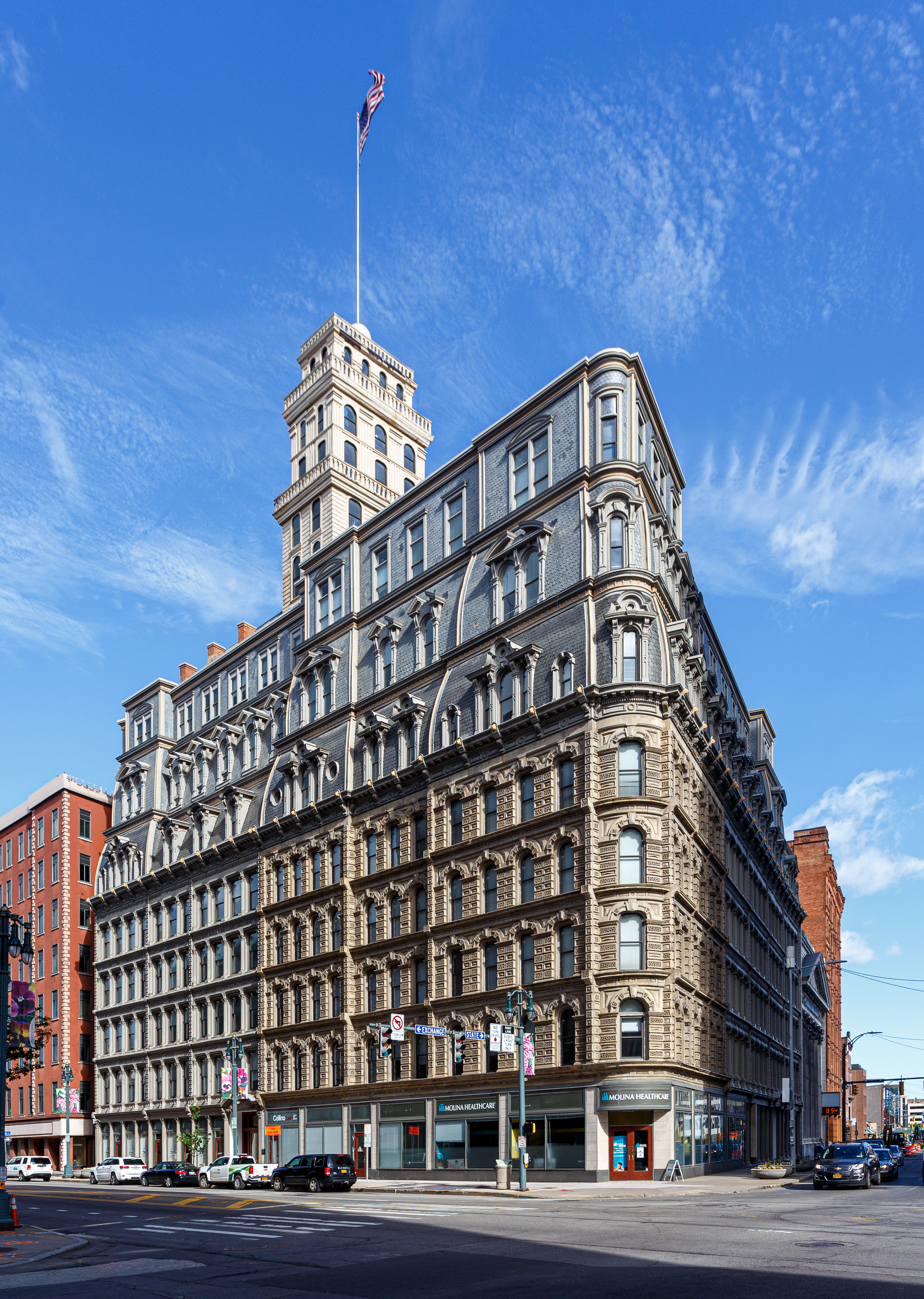
- The Powers Building

- Location within New York Location within the United States
- Interactive map showing the Powers Building location
- Location: 6-42 W. Main St., 20-56 Fitzhugh St., Rochester, New York
- Coordinates: 43°9′21″N 77°36′48″W
- Area: less than one acre
- Built: 1869
- Architect: Andrew Jackson Warner
- Architectural style: Second Empire
- NRHP reference No.: 73001204 (original); 100004417 (increase)

Significant dates
- Added to NRHP: April 3, 1973
- Boundary increase: September 13, 2019

The Powers Building is a historic office building located at the Four Corners in Rochester, Monroe County, New York. Built in stages beginning in 1865, the building was designed by prominent local architect Andrew Jackson Warner in the Second Empire style and was dedicated on January 18, 1871. It was the first large fireproof building in Rochester and the first in the city to have elevators. Named for its owner, banker Daniel Powers, the building is notable for its distinctive layered triple mansard roof and observation tower, the result of repeated upward expansions over two decades driven by Powers's determination to own the tallest building in the city.

It was listed on the National Register of Historic Places in 1973. In 2019, the adjacent Powers Hotel was also added to the listing.

== History ==
=== Site ===
The Powers Building stands on the site of Rochester's first permanent residence, a log cabin built by settler Hamlet Scrantom in 1812. A commemorative plaque on the Main Street side of the building marks the location.

=== Daniel Powers ===
Daniel William Powers (1818–1897) was born in Batavia and moved to Rochester as a young man to work at a hardware store. By 1850 he had established himself as a banker and stockbroker, opening the Powers Banking Office in the Eagle Block on the same site as the present building. Powers served twice as an alderman and was involved in numerous civic institutions, including serving as president of the board of trustees of the Rochester City Hospital and as a trustee of the Industrial School and the House of Refuge.

In 1863, Powers purchased the entire block bounded by State Street, East Main Street, Fitzhugh Street, and Church Street. By 1868, he had demolished every structure on the block and began construction on what would become Rochester's most prominent commercial building.

=== Construction and expansions ===
Construction began in 1865, and the original building was completed and dedicated on January 18, 1871. Andrew Jackson Warner designed it in the Second Empire style using cast iron, Ohio sandstone, brick, limestone, and marble. The building's construction consumed enormous quantities of material: approximately 65,000 square feet of Italian and Vermont marble, 8,000,000 pounds (3,600,000 kg) of iron, 80,000 yards of plastering, and 12,000 wagonloads of sand for mortar. The principal staircase alone contained 50 short tons (45 t) of iron. The building originally had around 1,000 tenants and its ten acres of floor space could, it was claimed, have held the entire population of Rochester at the time—some 80,000 people.

Powers was famously unwilling to let any neighboring structure surpass his building in height. When a taller building was erected nearby, he would commission further additions:

- 1872: A two-story tower and extension of the mansard roof over the corner section were added.
- 1881: A second mansard roof was added.
- 1888–1889: The third and final mansard roof was completed.
- 1890: A larger five-story tower was constructed on the roof, in response to the nearby Wilder Building, Rochester's first skyscraper, which had surpassed the Powers Building with its 12 stories in 1887.

Warner, who kept his own office in the building, was responsible for all of the additions. In an 1883 book about the building, author Alphonso A. Hopkins praised the architectural coherence of the structure despite its piecemeal construction.

=== Art gallery ===
In 1875, Powers converted the entire fifth floor of the building into an art gallery to display works he had acquired on travels throughout Europe, assembling one of the most extensive private art collections in the United States at that time. The public was admitted to the gallery for 25 cents. Powers intended to donate his collection to the city, which would have made it Rochester's first publicly owned art gallery. However, when the city refused to grant him tax breaks for the gallery, he withdrew the offer; after his death in 1897, the family sold most of the works at auction in New York.

For his lawyer tenants, Powers also acquired the law library of Roscoe Conkling, comprising some 6,000 volumes.

=== Later history ===
Beginning in 1896, Powers sold a portion of the building's first floor and basement to the Powers Bank. The remainder was sold to the Powers Commercial Fire-Proof Building Company in 1897, and the bank sold its portion to the same company the following year.

In the 1880s, Powers had constructed the Powers Hotel on a neighboring plot; it opened in 1883 with six stories, 300 guest rooms, four dining rooms, and a banquet hall seating 500. The hotel hosted notable events, including conventions of the New York State Woman Suffrage Association in 1905 and 1914, the latter presided over by Carrie Chapman Catt.

The Powers Building was also where Martha Matilda Harper opened Rochester's first public hair salon for women in 1888. Harper developed the Harper Method of hair care and is widely credited as a pioneer of retail franchising, eventually building a network of over 500 franchise locations worldwide.

Beginning in 1990, the building underwent a major renovation and modernization that was completed in 2003 at a cost of approximately $30 million.

== Architecture ==
The Powers Building is a nine-story, 165-by-171-foot (50 by 52 m) building laid out around a large open stairwell in the center. It occupies a prominent corner site at the intersection of Main Street and State Street, known as the Four Corners, and features frontages of 155 feet (47 m) on Main Street and 176 feet (54 m) on State Street. The building is constructed primarily of cast iron, brick, limestone, and marble, with cast iron supports and wall-to-wall marble floors contributing to its fireproof designation. The building's most distinctive feature is its layered silhouette of three successive mansard roofs capped by a five-story tower, a configuration sometimes described as resembling a wedding cake.

The building was also technologically innovative for its era. It was the first building west of New York City to be equipped with elevators, powered by a water tank in the tower, and it was reportedly the first commercial building in Rochester to be electrified, with power generated by boilers in the basement.

== See also ==
- National Register of Historic Places listings in Rochester, New York
- Daniel W. Powers
- Martha Matilda Harper
- Wilder Building

Records
Unknown	Tallest building in Rochester, NY; 165 feet (50 m); 1869-1890	Succeeded by Saint Michael's Church
