= Giambrone =

Giambrone is an Italian surname. Notable people with the surname include:

- Adam Giambrone (born 1977), Canadian politician and transportation consultant
- Jean Giambrone (1921–2013), American sportswriter
- Sean Giambrone (born 1999), American actor
