= Clarence Van Zandt =

Former Mayor of Rochester, New York

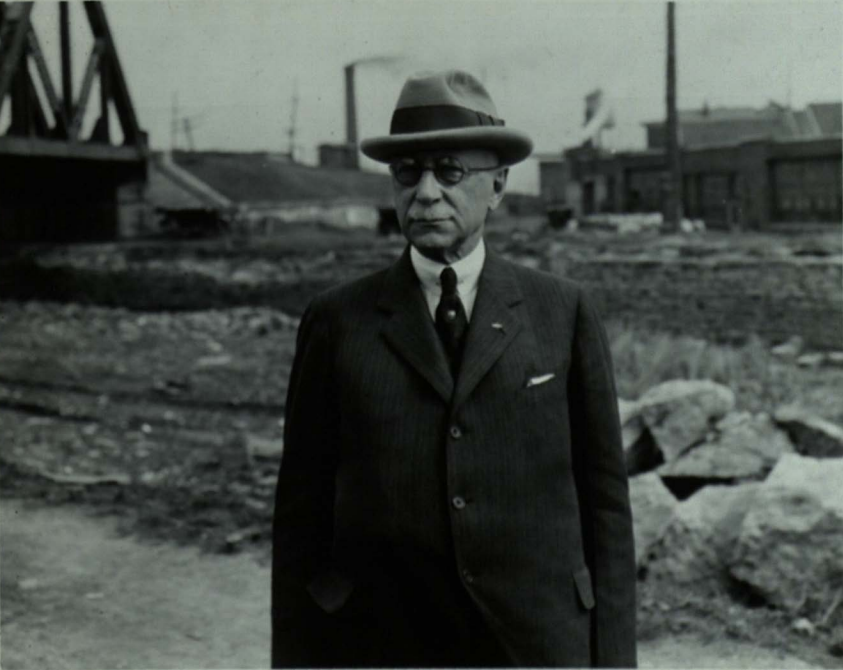

50th Mayor of Rochester, New York
- In office January 1, 1922 – June 17, 1926
- Preceded by: Hiram Edgerton
- Succeeded by: Martin B. O'Neil

Personal details
- Born: March 21, 1853 Rochester, New York
- Died: June 17, 1926 (aged 73) Haliburton County, Ontario
- Resting place: Mount Hope Cemetery, Rochester
- Party: Republican
- Spouse: Mary E. White
- Profession: Pharmacist

Clarence Duncan Van Zandt (March 21, 1853 – June 17, 1926) was an American businessman and politician who served as the 50th mayor of Rochester, New York from 1922 to 1926.

== Early life and career ==
Van Zandt was born in 1853 in Rochester. After receiving an education in the public schools, he was hired as an errand boy for the Lane and Paine Drug Company. In 1881, he became a member of the firm. That same year, he married Mary E. White. When Lane and Paine was incorporated as the Paine Drug Company in 1910, Van Zandt became the company president, and was the principal owner until the time of his death. Mary Van Zandt died in 1917.

== Mayor of Rochester ==
In 1921, long-serving mayor Hiram Edgerton announced his retirement. George Aldridge, the boss of the local Republican Party, faced a challenge to his leadership from city council member Chip Bostwick, and recruited Van Zandt to run against him. Van Zandt had no prior experience in politics but secured the party nomination and was elected. Aldridge and Edgerton both died the following June, leaving Van Zandt as the party leader. He was reelected in 1923 and 1925.

As mayor, Van Zandt oversaw the construction of the Rochester Subway, which began operations in 1927. Like his predecessor Edgerton, Van Zandt pursued municipal expansion into surrounding suburbs in order to extend municipal services to them. However, strong opposition campaigns were organized in 1924 against a proposal to annex neighborhoods of the towns of Brighton and Irondequoit. The proposal was defeated, and in 1927 a statewide referendum established home rule for all towns, halting any further expansion.

Reform groups sought to break the power of the Republican machine during Van Zandt's term. The Municipal Research Bureau, founded by George Eastman, became increasingly influential in the 1920s and made many policy recommendations. It joined forces with the City Manager League, led by Isaac Adler, to campaign for a new city charter. In 1925, a referendum was held to replace the city's mayor-council government with a council-manager government. Van Zandt remained neutral on the referendum, which passed. As a result, he was the last strong mayor of Rochester until the city charter was modified again in 1984.

== Death ==
Van Zandt unexpectedly died of a heart attack in 1926, during a trip to Bancroft, Ontario.

Political offices
Preceded by Hiram Edgerton	Mayor of Rochester, NY; 1922-1926	Succeeded by Martin B. O'Neil
