= Flag of Rochester, New York =

City of Rochester, New York
- Current Flag of Rochester, New York
- Adopted: December 16, 2025
- Design: The city mark and words "Flour City", "Flower City", and "City of Rochester" in white centered on a blue field

The flag of Rochester, New York was adopted as the city's official flag on December 16, 2025. The design consists of the city mark and words "Flour City", "Flower City", and "City of Rochester" in white centered on a blue field.

In November 2025, Mayor Malik Evans announced plans to change the city flag to commemorate the 50th anniversary of the Rochester city mark. The flag was already in use and was often mistaken for the official flag.

== Previous flag ==
City of Rochester, New York
- Historic Flag of Rochester, New York
- Adopted: 1934
- Relinquished: 2025

The first flag was designed in 1910 and adopted as the city's official flag in 1934. The design consists of a rectangle with blue, white, and yellow vertical stripes. The middle white stripe displays the Rochester family coat of arms, featuring a crane above three crescents.

Interest in a flag for the city was raised by the local chamber of commerce during an industrial exhibition in 1910. A design by David E. Spear, Jr. was designated by Mayor Hiram Edgerton on September 15, 1910. The city council later adopted this design as an official flag in 1934. However, the flag was seldom displayed; by the late 1950s, only four locations in the city flew it.

=== Symbolism ===
The Rochester Public Library gives the following description of the flag's symbolism:

==== Colors ====
- Blue: represents the city's water and electric power from the Genesee River and Lake Ontario
- White: represents the city's cleanliness
- Yellow: represents financial strength and prosperity

===== Symbols =====
- Coat of arms: possibly dates back to 1558 and Rochester family coat of arms in Essex
- Crane: represents vigilance
- Three crescent moons: represents fertility and prosperity
- Black bar: symbol of knighthood

== City mark ==
In 1975, Lee Green, a graphic designer employed by the City of Rochester, created the Rochester city mark as part of the Federal Design Improvement Program, a national initiative to enhance visual identity for local governments. The mark combines a stylized water wheel, representing Rochester's historic identity as the "Flour City," with a five-petaled lilac shape, representing its later identity as the "Flower City." The mark was officially approved by the Rochester City Council in 1976.

Beginning around 1979, a blue flag bearing the city mark came into widespread informal use, and it is this flag—rather than the official 1934 tricolor—that is most commonly displayed at city buildings and events.

In 2026, the city plans to celebrate the 50th anniversary of the city mark with a documentary film, public art installations, and a new "Flower Fest" artisan festival.

== See also ==
- Flag of New York
- Flag of Buffalo
