= Chandler Hale =

American government official

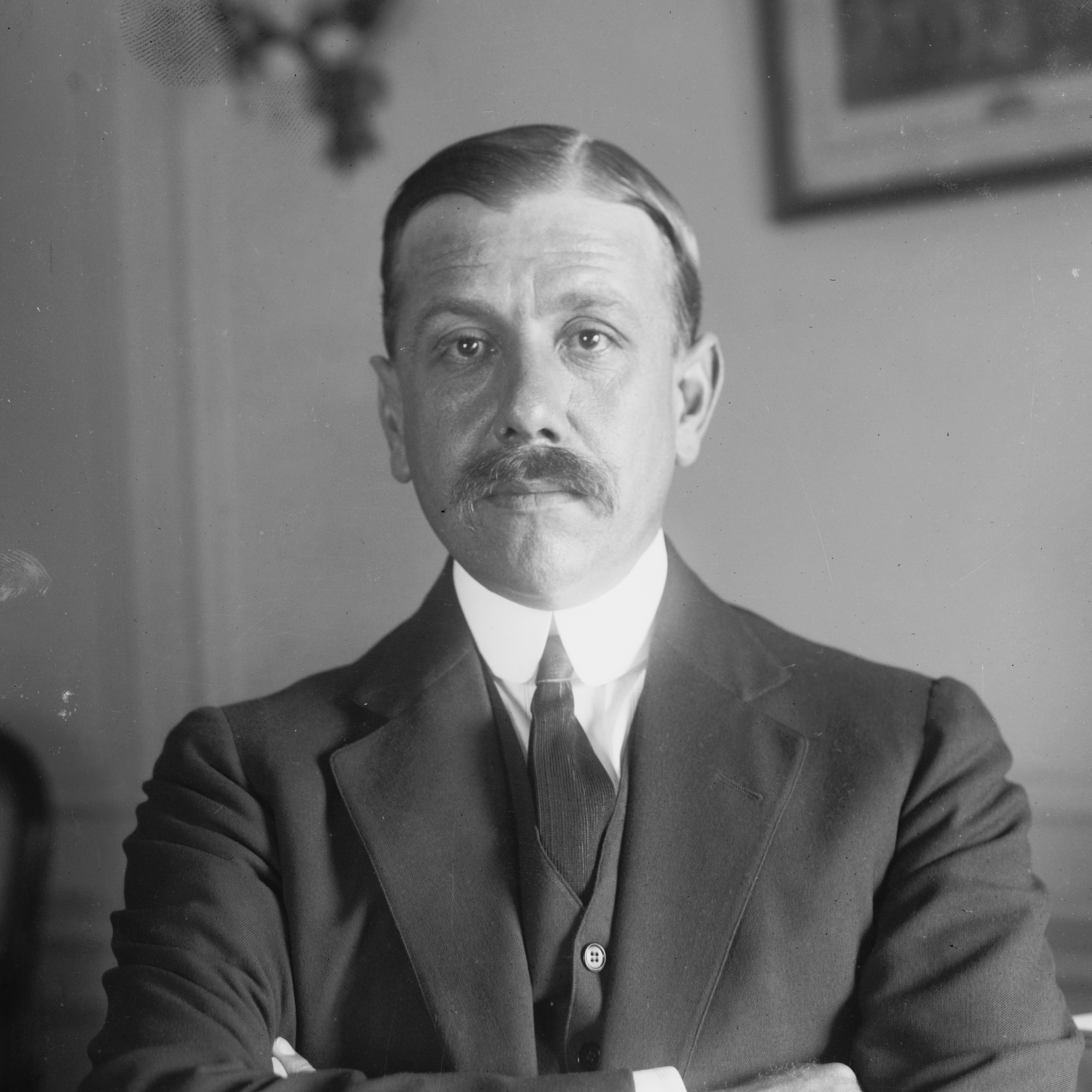

Third Assistant Secretary of State
- In office October 14, 1909 – April 21, 1913
- President: William Howard Taft
- Preceded by: William Phillips
- Succeeded by: Dudley Field Malone

Personal details
- Born: March 2, 1873 Washington, D.C., U.S.
- Died: May 23, 1951 (aged 78) Washington, D.C., U.S.
- Spouse: Rachel Burnside Cameron (m. 1897)
- Relations: Frederick Hale (brother); Zachariah Chandler (grandfather); Robert Hale (cousin)
- Parent(s): Eugene Hale; Mary Douglas Chandler

Chandler Hale (March 2, 1873 – May 23, 1951) was a United States diplomat who served as Third Assistant Secretary of State from 1909 to 1913.

== Early life ==
Chandler Hale was born in 1873. He was the son of the former Mary Douglas Chandler (1848–1930) and Eugene Hale (1836–1918), who later served as United States Senator from Maine from 1881 to 1911 as a Republican. Hale's younger brother, Frederick Hale, was born in 1874 and also served as a U.S. Senator from Maine.

His maternal grandfather was Zachariah Chandler, the former Mayor of Detroit, Secretary of the Interior (under Presidents Grant and Hayes), Chair of the Republican National Committee and a U.S. Senator from Michigan. Among his cousins was Robert Hale, a U.S. Representative from Maine.

== Career ==
In 1892, Hale was secretary to the U.S. delegation at the International Monetary Conference in Brussels. Hale spent December 1894 through April 1895 touring Mexico and the Caribbean with Henry Adams.

Shortly after graduating from college, in 1897, Hale became a Secretary at the United States Embassy in Rome. From 1901 to 1902, he was secretary of legation at the U.S. Embassy in Vienna, and then secretary of the embassy from 1902 to 1905. In 1907, he served as secretary to the U.S. delegation to the Second Hague Conference.

In 1909, President of the United States William Howard Taft named Hale Third Assistant Secretary of State, with Hale holding this office from October 14, 1909, until April 21, 1913.

Hale returned to the diplomatic field in 1914, serving in the United States Embassy in London as the official responsible for Austrian affairs.

== Personal life ==
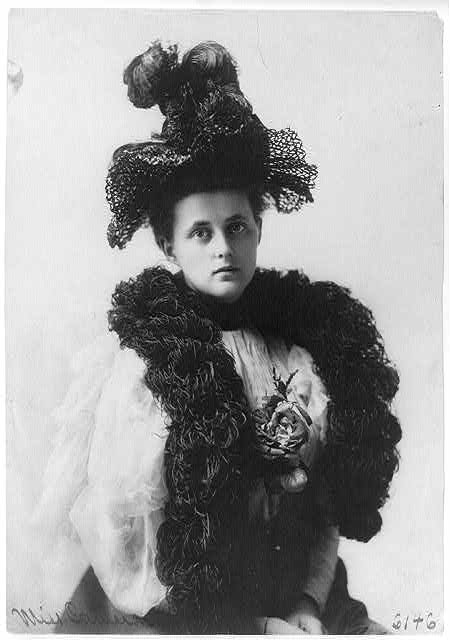
Photograph of his wife, Rachel Cameron Hale, c. 1896.

On September 15, 1897, Hale was married to Rachel Burnside Cameron (1871–1963). Rachel was the daughter of Mary (née McCormick) Cameron and J. Donald Cameron, a Secretary of War (under President Grant), U.S. Senator from Pennsylvania and the Chair of the Republican National Committee immediately after his grandfather. Her younger half-sister, Martha Cameron, married Sir Ronald Charles Lindsay in 1909. Together, Rachel and Chandler were the parents of:

- Chandler Hale Jr. (1898–1962), who married Eleanor Gaskill of Santa Fe, New Mexico.
- Donald Cameron Hale (1902–1943), who was killed in action in Italy during World War II.
- Mary Cameron Hale (1904–1988), who married George Howland Chase III (1898–1981), the assistant general counsel of the Federal Reserve Board, in 1929.
- Eugene Hale III (1906–1920), who died aged 14.

In 1929, Hale's wife purchased Poplar Hill, an estate near Clinton, Maryland, which she renamed His Lordship's Kindness.

After a six week illness, Hale died in a hospital in Washington, D.C., on May 23, 1951.

Government offices
Preceded by William Phillips	Third Assistant Secretary of State; October 14, 1909 – April 21, 1913	Succeeded by Dudley Field Malone
