= Our Lady of Victory Roman Catholic Church =

Historic church in New York, United States

- U.S. National Register of Historic Places
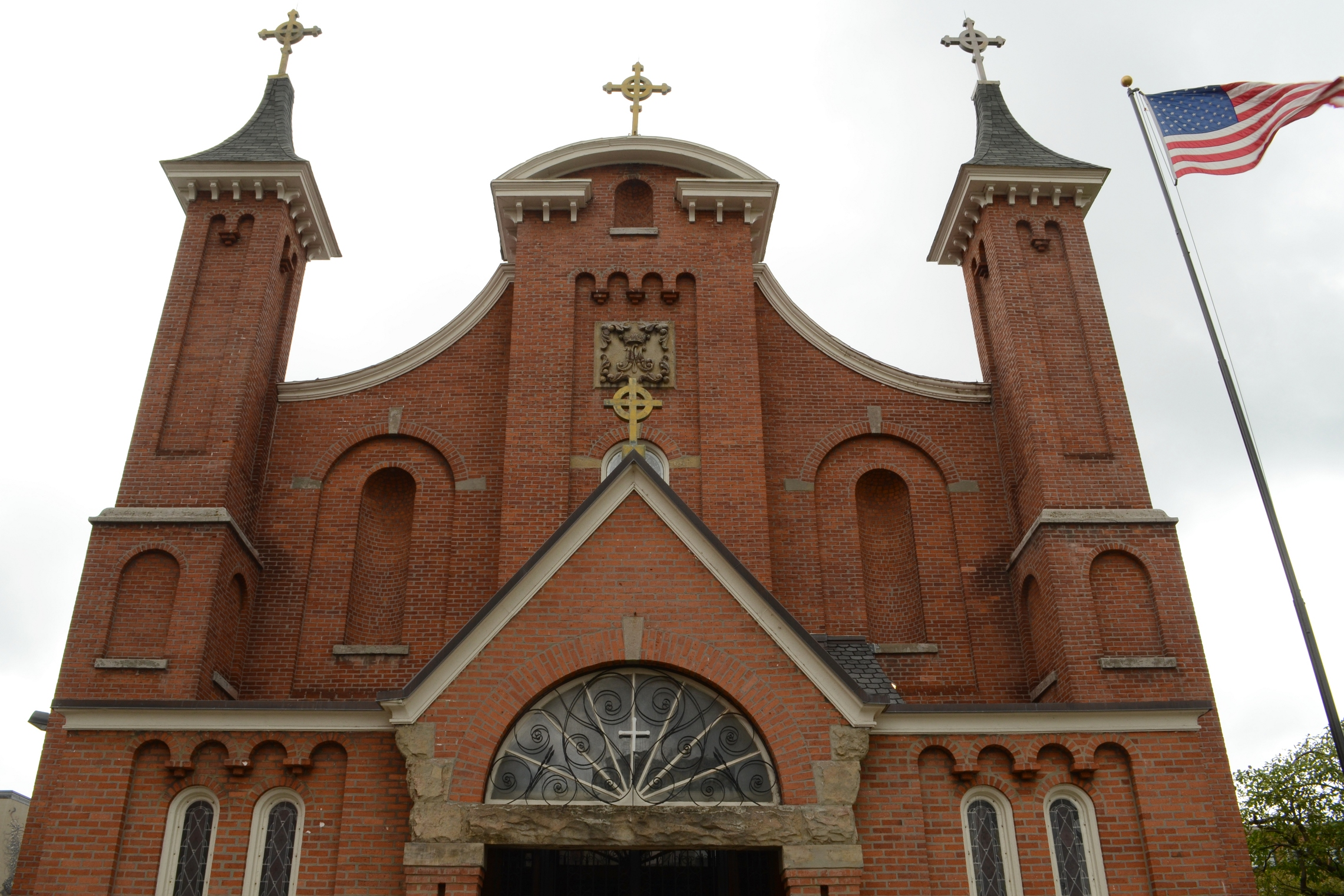
- Our Lady of Victory Roman Catholic Church, September 2012

- Location within New York Location within the United States
- Location: 210 Pleasant St., Rochester, New York
- Coordinates: 43°9′32″N 77°36′33″W
- Area: 0.6 acres (0.24 ha)
- Built: 1868
- Architect: Warner, Andrew J.
- Architectural style: Late 19th And 20th Century Revivals, Early Romanesque Revival
- MPS: Inner Loop MRA
- NRHP reference No.: 92000153
- Added to NRHP: March 12, 1992

Our Lady of Victory Roman Catholic Church, also known as Our Lady of Victory / St. Joseph Roman Catholic Church, is a historic Roman Catholic church located at Rochester in Monroe County, New York. It was designed by noted Rochester architect Andrew Jackson Warner and is a French Romanesque Revival style brick cruciform plan church built in 1868. It features two slender towers with concave roofs, a recessed entrance inside a single-story protruding section, and a semi-circular stained-glass window.

It was listed on the National Register of Historic Places in 1992.
