= Richard J. Curran =

American politician

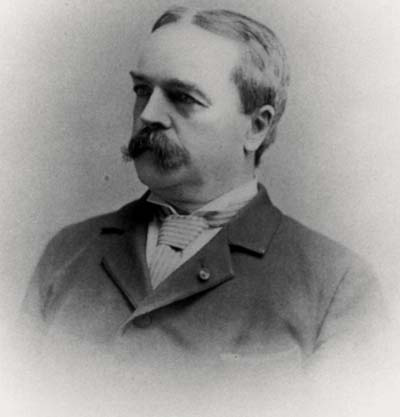
- Born: January 4, 1838; Ennis, County Clare, Ireland
- Died: June 1, 1915 (aged 77); Rochester, New York
- Burial place: Holy Sepulchre Cemetery (Rochester, New York)
- Military career
- Allegiance: United States of America
- Branch: United States Army
- Service years: 1861 - 1865
- Rank: Assistant Surgeon
- Units: (New York (state)) 33rd New York Volunteer Infantry (New York (state)) 9th New York Cavalry
- Conflicts: American Civil War; Seven Days' Battles; Battle of Antietam; Battle of Fredericksburg; Battle of Chancellorsville
- Awards: Medal of Honor
- Other work: lawyer, judge, politician

Richard J. Curran (January 4, 1838 – June 1, 1915) was an Irish-American surgeon, army officer, and politician. He received the Medal of Honor for his actions during the American Civil War.

== Early life ==
He was born in the town of Ennis in County Clare, Ireland. Curran immigrated with his parents to the United States in 1850, and attended Harvard Medical School, graduating in 1859.

== Civil War ==
At the start of the Civil War, he helped raise two volunteer companies (designated A company & K company) from Seneca Falls, New York, and joined the 33rd New York Infantry in May 1861, becoming an assistant surgeon in August 1862. He received the Medal of Honor for the Battle of Antietam, where he was the regiment's only medical officer present in the field. When the 33rd New York was mustered out in June 1863, he joined the 6th New York Cavalry, and subsequently became the 9th New York Cavalry, serving as the latter's regimental surgeon until the surrender of Robert E. Lee at Appomattox Court House.

== Career ==
Following the war, Curran opened a pharmacy in Rochester, New York, where he also participated in local politics. He was elected to the New York State Assembly as a member of the Republican Party in 1891, serving in 1892. He was a Mayor of Rochester, New York in 1892, serving a two-year term.

== Honors ==
Following is Curran's medal of honor citation:

Rank and organization: Assistant Surgeon, 33rd New York Infantry. Place and date: Antietam, Md., 17 September 1862. Entered service at: Seneca Falls, N.Y. Born: 4 January 1838, Ireland. Date of issue: 30 March 1898. Voluntarily exposed himself to great danger by going to the fighting line there succoring the wounded and helpless and conducting them to the field hospital.

== Personal life ==
He was a companion of the New York Commandery of the Military Order of the Loyal Legion of the United States.

He died on June 1, 1915 and was buried in Holy Sepulchre Cemetery.

New York State Assembly
Preceded by Cornelius R. Parsons	New York State Assembly; Monroe County, 2nd District; 1892	Succeeded by James M. E. O'Grady
Government offices
Preceded by William Carroll	Mayor of Rochester, New York; 1892-1894	Succeeded by George W. Aldridge
