= Hiram Edgerton =

Mayor of Rochester, New York from 1908 to 1921

Hiram H. Edgerton
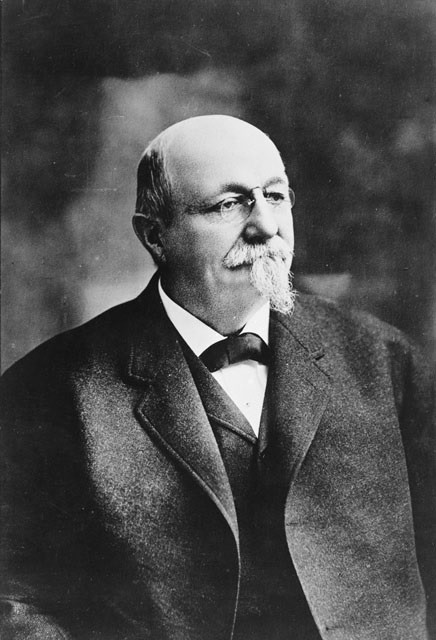

49th Mayor of Rochester, New York
- In office January 1, 1908 – December 31, 1921
- Preceded by: James Goold Cutler
- Succeeded by: Clarence Van Zandt

Personal details
- Born: April 19, 1847 Belfast, New York, U.S.
- Died: June 18, 1922 (aged 75) Rochester, New York, U.S.
- Resting place: Mount Hope Cemetery, Rochester
- Party: Republican
- Spouse: Medora L. DeWitt
- Profession: Contractor

Hiram Haskell Edgerton (April 19, 1847 – June 18, 1922) was an American businessman and politician who served as the 49th mayor of Rochester, New York from 1908 to 1921.

== Biography ==
=== Early life ===
Edgerton was born on April 19, 1847, in Belfast, New York. When he was 11 years old, his family moved to Rochester, where his father ran a lumber business and construction firm. In 1868, he married Medora L. DeWitt. The couple had two daughters. In 1880, he inherited the construction firm. Under his direction, the firm constructed several churches, government buildings, and commercial buildings like the Sibley's, Lindsay and Curr Building in Rochester.

=== Political career ===
Edgerton entered local politics in the 1870s, serving as a board of education member from 1872 to 1876. He became an ally of Republican boss George W. Aldridge, who backed him for nominations to higher offices. In 1895, Edgerton was recruited by Aldridge to succeed him as mayor. He lost the close election to George E. Warner, a Democrat. Edgerton was elected to the common council in 1900, becoming its president. In 1907 he made a second run for mayor and was elected, succeeding James G. Cutler. He then served for seven consecutive two-year terms before retiring in 1921. During this long tenure, the city constructed its first public library and numerous infrastructure projects, including a flood wall along the Genesee River and a conduit to bring water from Hemlock Lake to the city. Edgerton received criticism for his decision to close the city's social centers, which frequently featured socialist speakers and other opponents of the Republican machine.

While Edgerton was in office, Rochester's industry and population rapidly expanded. To coordinate the expansion of city services, he sought to annex several neighborhoods from surrounding towns directly into the city. In 1914, the city annexed new residential developments in the towns of Gates, Brighton, and Irondequoit; in 1916, the village of Charlotte and its port were annexed; and in 1919, a large industrial district in the towns of Gates and Greece was annexed. When the New York Barge Canal opened in 1918, the old section of the Erie Canal running through the city was abandoned. Edgerton and other city officials pursued the construction of a subway system in the abandoned canal bed. Construction was unanimously approved by the common council on November 9, 1921, and the Rochester subway would later begin operations in 1927.

The 1910 Flag of Rochester, New York

In 1910, the issue of a city flag arose at an industrial exhibition. A committee recommended a design by David E. Spear to be adopted as an official flag. Edgerton issued a pronouncement for the adoption of the flag, which was officially approved by the city council in 1934.

=== Death and legacy ===
Edgerton died on June 18, 1922, in Rochester, and he was buried in Mount Hope Cemetery. Edgerton Park in Rochester is named for him.

Political offices
Preceded by James G. Cutler	Mayor of Rochester, NY; 1908–1921	Succeeded by Clarence Van Zandt
