= Holley Village Historic District =

Historic district in New York, United States

- U.S. National Register of Historic Places
- U.S. Historic district
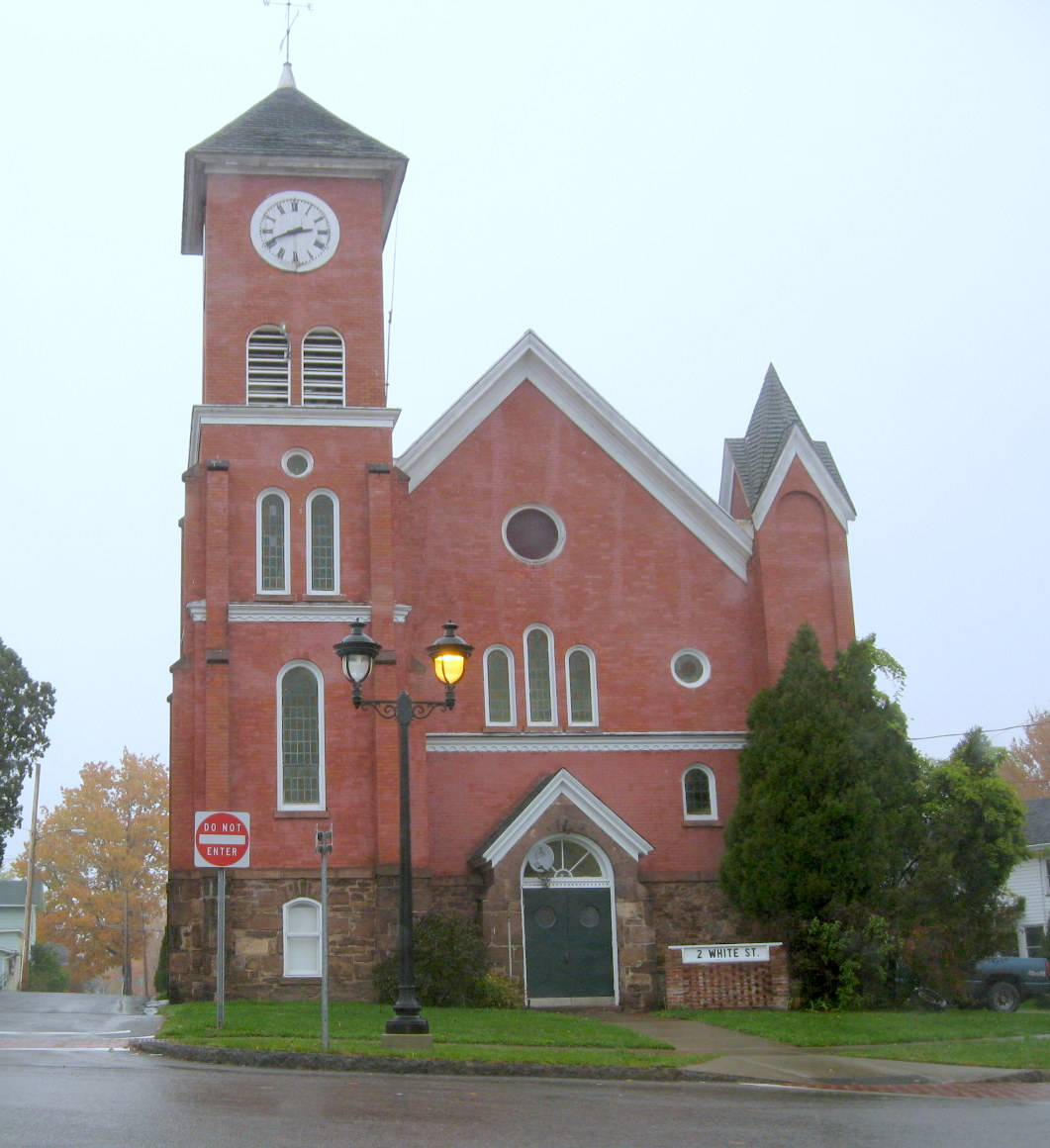
- Former First Methodist Episcopal Church, October 2009

- Location within New York Location within the United States
- Location: 1 Village Sq., 3-35 Frisbe Terrace, Public Sq., 32-34 Albion, 1-13 S. Main, 1 Wright, 2 White, 1 & 4-18 Thomas Sts., Holley, New York
- Coordinates: 43°13′33″N 78°01′36″W
- Area: 16.51 acres (6.68 ha)
- Built: c. 1822-1952
- Architect: A.J. Warner, Carl Ade
- Architectural style: Greek Revival, Italianate, Queen Anne, Beaux Arts, Late Gothic Revival
- NRHP reference No.: 15000539
- Added to NRHP: August 24, 2015

Holley Village Historic District is a national historic district located at Holley, Orleans County, New York. The district encompasses 40 contributing buildings, 1 contributing site, and 1 contributing object in the central business district of the village of Holley. The district developed between about 1822 and 1952, and includes buildings in a variety of architectural styles including Greek Revival, Italianate, Queen Anne, Beaux Arts, and Late Gothic Revival. Notable contributing resources include the Public Square and Salisbury Fountain (1914), First Presbyterian Church (1907-1908, 1958–1959), White-Alis Building (c. 1875), Village Building (c. 1880), Rutland Block/Lockwood Building/Community Library (1896), Odd Fellows Hall (1890), Downs Residence (c. 1860s), St. Mary's Roman Catholic Church (1904-1905), Downs Hotel/Hotel Holley designed by Andrew Jackson Warner (1893, 1920s), Village Building and Holley Standard (1899, 1903), First Methodist Episcopal Church (1868-1869), and the Holley High School (1930-1931).

It was listed on the National Register of Historic Places in 2015.
