= Francis Tumblety =

Charlatan; Jack the Ripper suspect

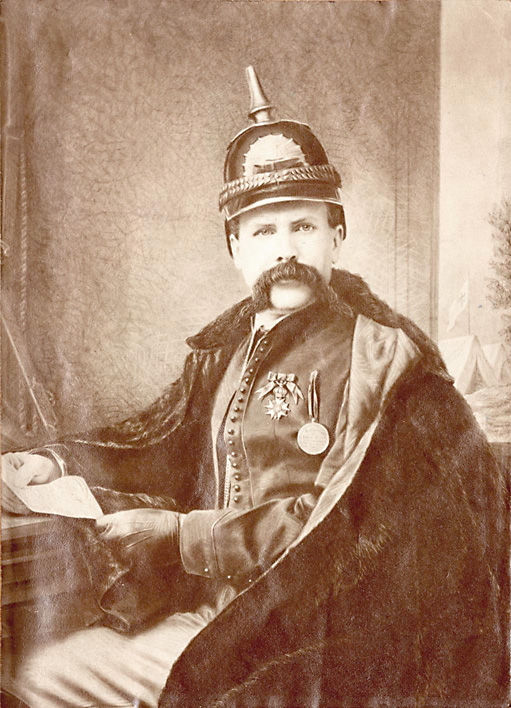
- Born: c. 1833; Ireland
- Died: May 28, 1903 (aged 69–70); St. Louis, Missouri, U.S.
- Resting place: Holy Sepulchre Cemetery, Rochester, New York
- Other name: Frank Townsend
- Occupation: Medical quack
- Known for: Jack the Ripper suspect

Francis Tumblety (c. 1833 – May 28, 1903) was an Irish-born American medical quack who earned a small fortune posing as an "Indian Herb" doctor throughout the United States and Canada. He was an eccentric self-promoter and was often in trouble with the law. He has been put forward as a suspect for the notorious and unsolved Jack the Ripper murder spree in Whitechapel, London, in 1888.

== Early life ==
According to the 1850 United States census, Tumblety was born in Ireland. His parents, James and Margaret Tumuelty (so spelled on their tombstone), along with his 10 brothers and sisters, immigrated to Rochester, New York, a few years after his birth. By the age of 17 he was selling books, which were possibly pornographic, along the Erie Canal between Rochester and Buffalo. He was briefly employed as a cleaner at "Lispenard's Hospital" in Rochester. He left home around 17, and did not return for 10 years.

== Career ==
Tumblety set himself up in business, initially in Detroit. He claimed to be a "great physician", but was commonly perceived as a quack. He sold patent medicines such as "Tumblety's Pimple Destroyer" and "Dr. Morse's Indian Root Pills", and gained a reputation for his eccentric, ostentatious clothes, which were frequently of a military nature. According to Tumblety, by 1857, he was practicing medicine in Canada, before moving to New York and Washington, D.C., where he claimed to have first been introduced to Abraham Lincoln. Tumblety's medicinal approach was based on herbal remedies over mineral "poisons" (mercury) or surgical techniques. He was connected to the death of one of his patients in Boston, but escaped prosecution.

In 1858, Tumblety returned to Rochester apparently a rich man, making an ostentatious display of his wealth and new social standing, and claiming that it had been achieved through patenting of his medicinal cures.

Federal tax records show he was in Maryland in early 1863, but he soon moved to St. Louis, Missouri, living at 50 Olive Street.

On May 5, 1865, Tumblety was arrested in St. Louis and taken to Washington, D.C., on orders of the Secretary of War, Edwin Stanton, for alleged complicity in the assassination of Abraham Lincoln, because the police believed that he was an associate of David Herold, who was captured with John Wilkes Booth. Tumblety denied any association with Herold, and there was nothing to tie him to the plot, so Tumblety was released without charge on May 30.

In 1881, Tumblety was arrested in New Orleans for pickpocketing, his alleged victim being an employee of the U.S. District Attorney. However, the "private detective" who arrested Tumblety was later accused of attempting to blackmail him.

Charles Dunham claimed that Tumblety appeared to revel in denouncing all women, but reserved a special hatred for prostitutes; according to Dunham he blamed his misogyny on a failed marriage to a prostitute. At an all-male dinner party in Washington, D.C., Tumblety allegedly displayed a collection of uteruses preserved in jars in his study, and proudly boasted that they came from "every class of woman". Dunham, however, had numerous forgery and perjury convictions, so this testimony is questionable.

== Jack the Ripper suspect ==
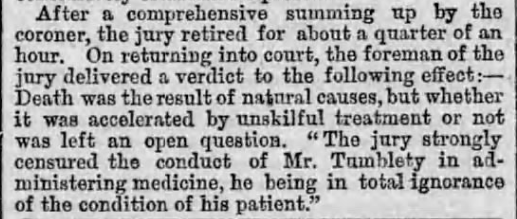
January 1875 newspaper excerpt from The Liverpool Weekly Mercury about Tumblety

Tumblety visited Europe several times, including Ireland, Scotland, England, Germany, and France. He claimed to have been introduced to Charles Dickens and King William of Germany, and to have provided treatment to Louis Napoleon, for which he was awarded the Legion of Honour. During one visit he became closely acquainted with writer Hall Caine. As a young man of 21, Caine encountered the self-proclaimed ‘Great American Doctor’, aged 43, after he set up at 177 Duke Street, Liverpool in 1874, offering herbal cure-all elixirs and Patent medicines to the public, which he claimed were secrets of the American Indians.

Following the death of Edward Hanratty, a railway worker, in January 1875, the same night he took a spoon of medicine supplied by Tumblety, and action taken by William Carroll to sue Tumblety for £200 after allegedly publishing a false testimonial, Tumblety fled to London. Many newspapers reported the stories and in the wake of this adverse publicity, Tumblety recruited Caine to edit his biography. The pamphlet entitled Passages from the Life of Dr Francis Tumblety, the fourth of Tumblety's biographies, was published in March 1875.

Professional police officers and amateur historical researchers Stewart Evans and Paul Gainey detailed evidence in their 1996 book Jack the Ripper: First American Serial Killer that Tumblety was temporarily resident in a boarding house in the Whitechapel district during the brief period of the murder rampage of Jack the Ripper, and pieced together a case that he may be the culprit.

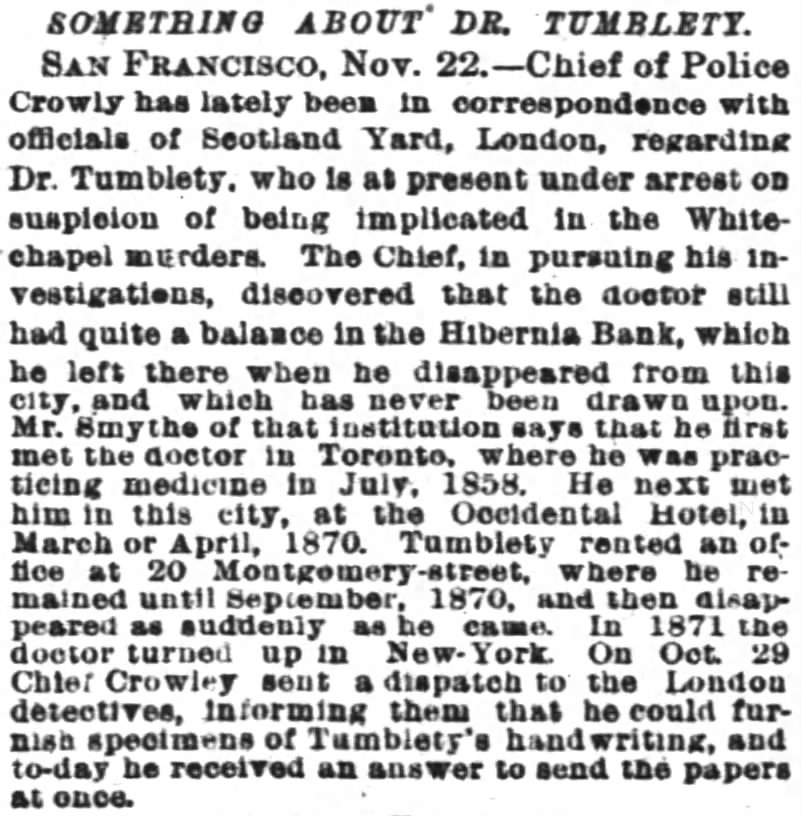
Newspaper article about Tumblety in The New York Times in November 1888

The Metropolitan Police arrested Tumblety on 7 November 1888 on unrelated charges of gross indecency, apparently for having been caught engaging in a homosexual encounter, which was illegal at the time. Two days later on 9 November, Mary Jane Kelly was murdered. Though according to Tumblety's arrest record he was not bailed until 16 November, David Barratt has advanced a case that he might have been released beforehand.

Whilst awaiting trial on the indecency charge on bail of £300 (equivalent to £34,000 today), and knowing that Scotland Yard was increasingly interested in him with regard to the recent murder spree in Whitechapel, he fled England for France on 20 November under the false name of "Frank Townsend", and on 24 November 1888 he returned to the United States. Already notorious in the United States for his self-promotion and previous brushes with the law, Tumblety's arrest in London was reported in The New York Times as being connected to the Ripper murders. An article in early December in the Democrat and Chronicle of his hometown of Rochester concluded with an acquaintance directly stating, "Knowing him as I do I should not be the least surprised if he turned out to be Jack the Ripper."

American newspaper reports that Scotland Yard tried to extradite him have not been confirmed by research in the contemporary British press or the London police files. However, English police inspector Walter Andrews travelled to America, perhaps partly to trace Tumblety. The New York City Police, who had him under surveillance, said "there is no proof of his complicity in the Whitechapel murders, and the crime for which he is under bond in London is not extraditable". Tumblety published a self-aggrandising pamphlet titled Dr. Francis Tumblety – Sketch of the Life of the Gifted, Eccentric and World Famed Physician, in which he attacked the rumours in the press but omitted any mention of his criminal charges and arrest.

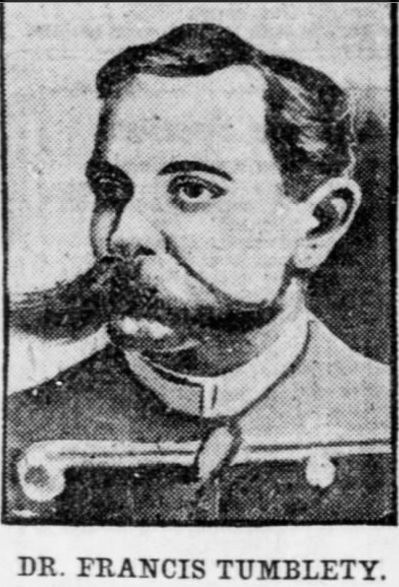
A drawing of Tumblety published in 1903

Tumblety was mentioned as a Ripper suspect by former Detective Chief Inspector John Littlechild of the Metropolitan Police in a letter to journalist and author George R. Sims, dated 23 September 1913, which was discovered by Evans and Gainey for sale in an antiquarian bookshop in Richmond-upon-Thames. Littlechild suspected Tumblety because of his extreme misogyny and his previous criminal record.

Other Ripperologists have dismissed Tumblety as a plausible Ripper suspect, citing the fact that his appearance and age did not match the description of any of the men that were seen with the murder victims, and that his relatively tall height of at least 5 feet 10 inches (1.78 m) and enormous moustache would have made him particularly conspicuous. However, a contemporary interview describes Tumblety as having a much smaller moustache at the time of the Whitechapel murders than is seen in the well-known photograph of him.

== Last years ==
Tumblety returned to Rochester and moved in with an elderly female relative, whose house also served as his office. He was living in Baltimore, Maryland, during the 1900 census, but returned to St. Louis, where he died on May 28, 1903, of heart disease. He again used the alias "Townsend" when registering at a hospital before his death. His body was buried in the family plot in Rochester's Holy Sepulchre Cemetery. His cash estate of $138,000 ($4.95 million in 2025) became the subject of a lawsuit, as his will only provided instruction for approximately half that amount. The lawsuit was eventually settled by a compromise between the claimants in January 1908.
