= Byron R. Newton =

American journalist and political figure (1861–1938)

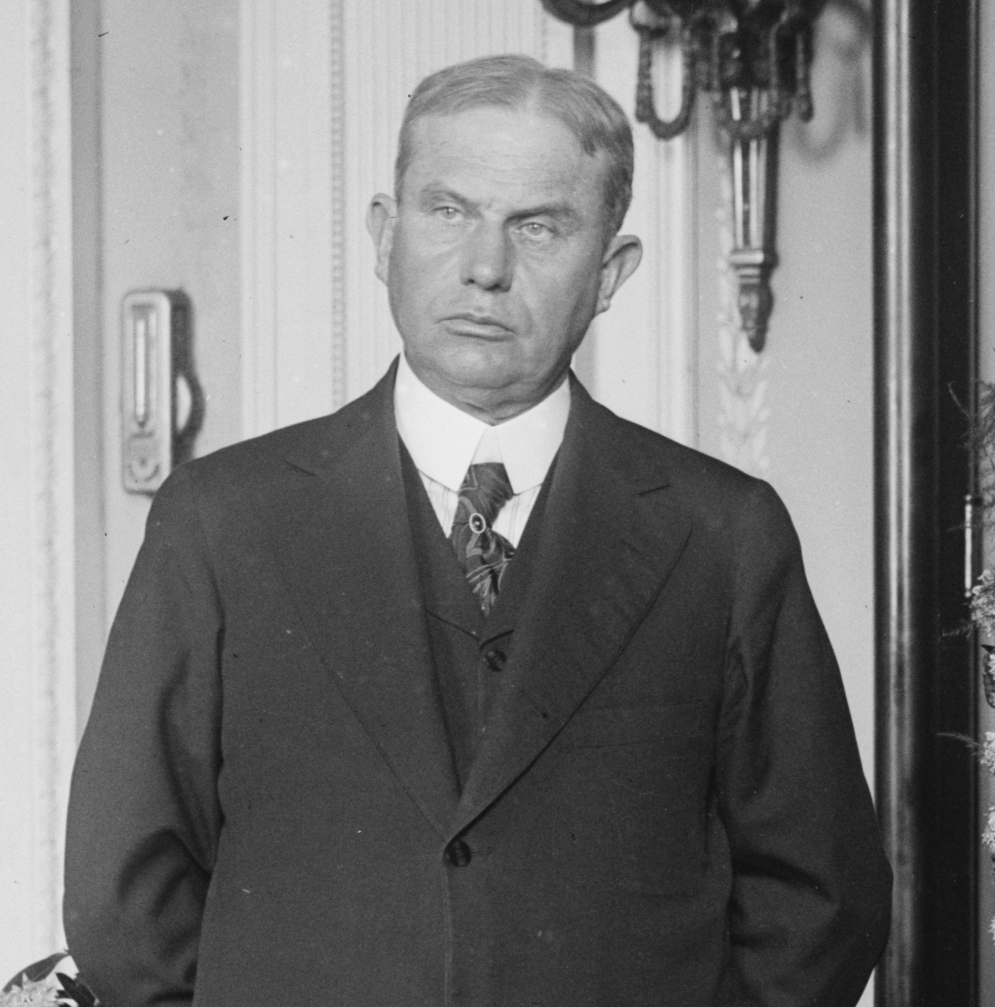
- Newton in 1917

Collector of the Port of New York
- In office 1917–1921
- Preceded by: Dudley Field Malone
- Succeeded by: George W. Aldridge

Personal details
- Born: Byron Rufus Newton; August 4, 1861 Wirt, New York, U.S.
- Died: March 20, 1938 (aged 76) Bayside, Queens, U.S.

Byron Rufus Newton (August 4, 1861 – March 20, 1938) was an American journalist, political figure, early aviation promoter, and author of satirical poetry. He was the publicity director of Woodrow Wilson's presidential campaign in 1912, and served as Collector of the Port of New York from 1917 to 1921.

== Biography ==
He was born in Wirt, New York, on August 4, 1861, the son of Laurens C. Newton, a farmer who claimed a remote relation to Sir Isaac Newton. He attended Oberlin College Preparatory School from 1882 to 1884.

He was a reporter for the Buffalo Evening News and the New York Herald and he went to Cuba to cover the Spanish–American War.

He became private secretary to William Gibbs McAdoo in 1910, which brought him into Woodrow Wilson's orbit; he served as publicity director in Wilson's 1912 presidential campaign. After Wilson was elected, and McAdoo became Secretary of the Treasury, Newton was appointed First Assistant Secretary of the U.S. Treasury, and in 1917–21 served as Collector of Customs for the Port of New York. Wilson also appointed him to the National Advisory Committee for Aeronautics.

In 1933, Newton helped lead the fusion campaign that elected Fiorello H. LaGuardia as mayor. Later, LaGuardia appointed Newton Tax Commissioner for Queens.

Byron R. Newton died on March 20, 1938, in Bayside, Queens, New York City, at the age of 76. He was buried in Flushing Cemetery.

== "Owed To New York" ==
In 1905, while working at the Herald, he wrote the satirical poem "Owed to New York", which has been frequently quoted and republished.

Vulgar of manner, overfed,
Overdressed and underbred,
Heartless, Godless, Hell's delight,
Rude by day and lewd by night;
Bedwarfed the man, o'ergrown the brute,
Ruled by boss and prostitute:
Purple-robed and pauper-clad,
Raving, rotting, money-mad;
A squirming herd in Mammon's mesh,
A wilderness of human flesh;
Crazed by avarice, lust and rum,
New York, thy name's "Delirium."

Government offices
Preceded by Dudley Field Malone	Collector of the Port of New York; 1917–1921	Succeeded by George W. Aldridge
