= Wilder Building =

Historic commercial building in New York, United States

- U.S. National Register of Historic Places
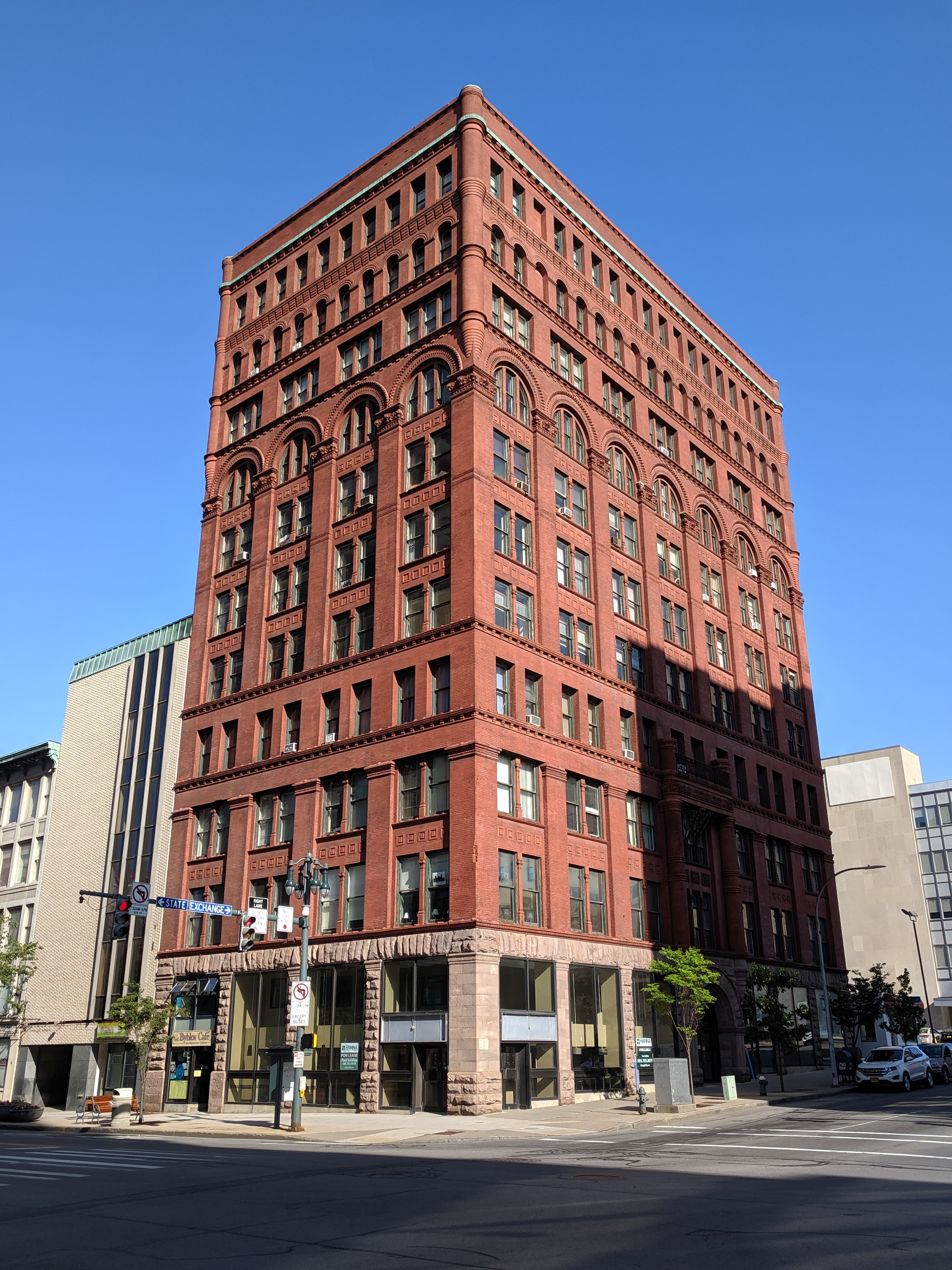

- Location within New York Location within the United States
- Location: 1 E. Main St., Rochester, New York
- Coordinates: 43°9′19″N 77°36′44″W
- Area: less than one acre
- Built: 1887
- Architect: Warner & Brockett
- Architectural style: Romanesque
- MPS: Inner Loop MRA
- NRHP reference No.: 85002863
- Added to NRHP: October 04, 1985

Wilder Building is a historic office building located in Rochester, New York. It is an eleven-story steel or iron framed brick clad structure built between 1887 and 1888 in a modified Romanesque style. It is considered Rochester's first modern skyscraper and is considered to be among the oldest of the early skyscrapers. It was designed by noted Rochester architects Warner & Brockett.

It was listed on the National Register of Historic Places in 1985.

The Wilder Building originally contained spires at each corner of its roof, but they have since been removed.

== Mail Chute ==
James Goold Cutler received U.S. Patent 284,951 on September 11, 1883, for the mail chute. The first one was installed in 1884 in the Elwood Building. Then, during its 1887 construction, Cutler installed a perfected mail chute in the Wilder Building. With the Elwood Building having been demolished in 1965, the Wilder Building's mail chute is currently the oldest surviving one.

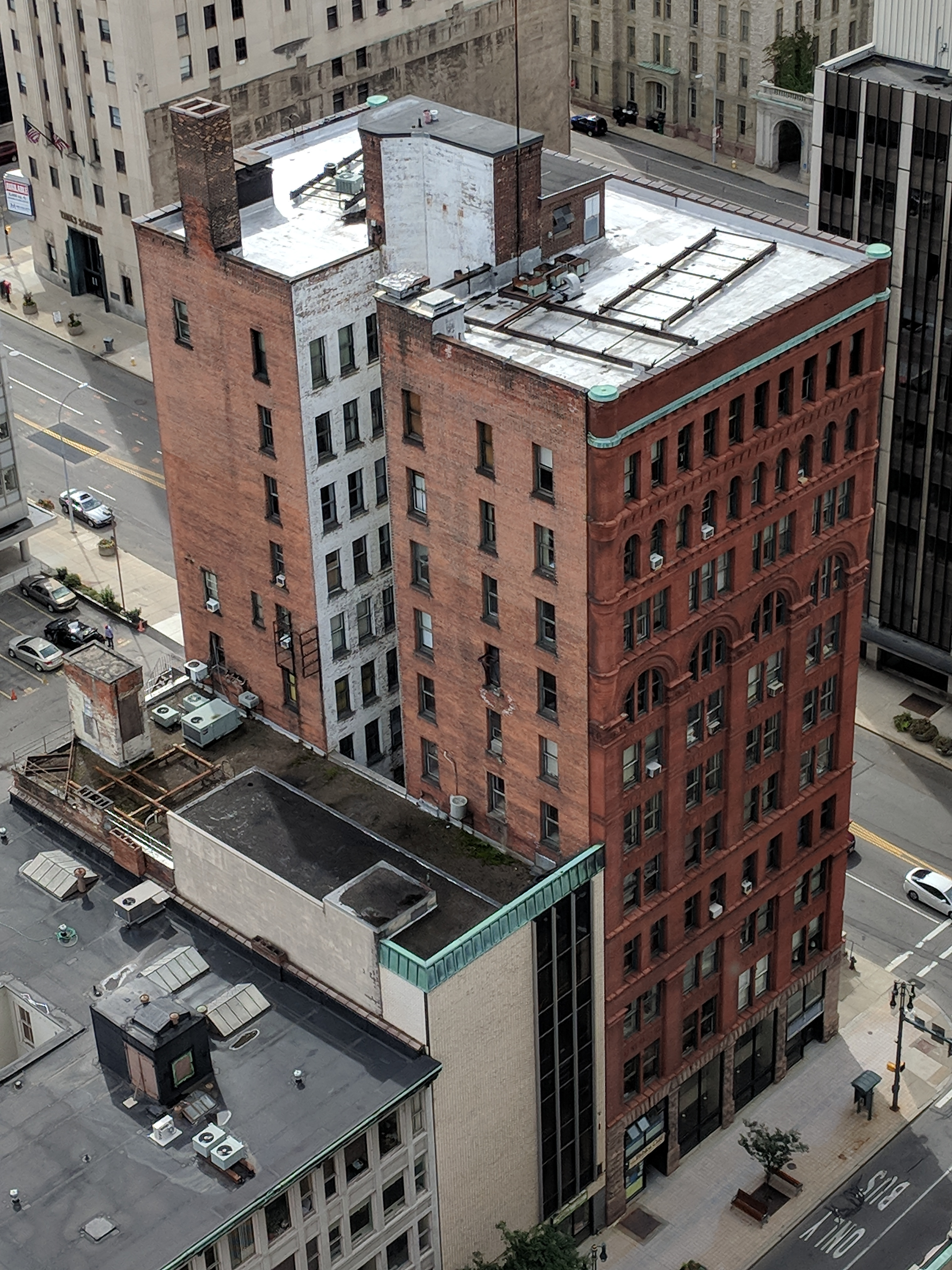

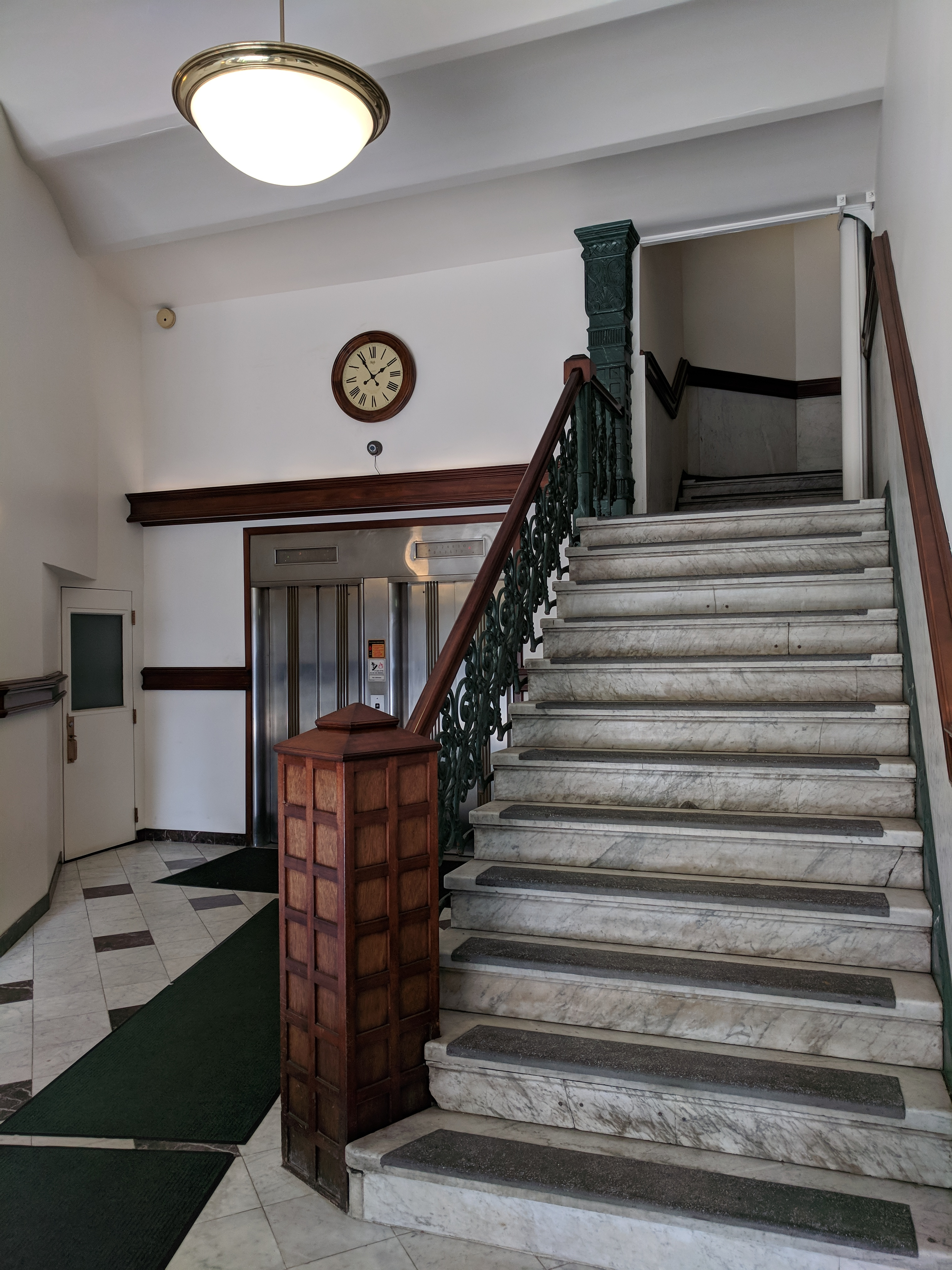

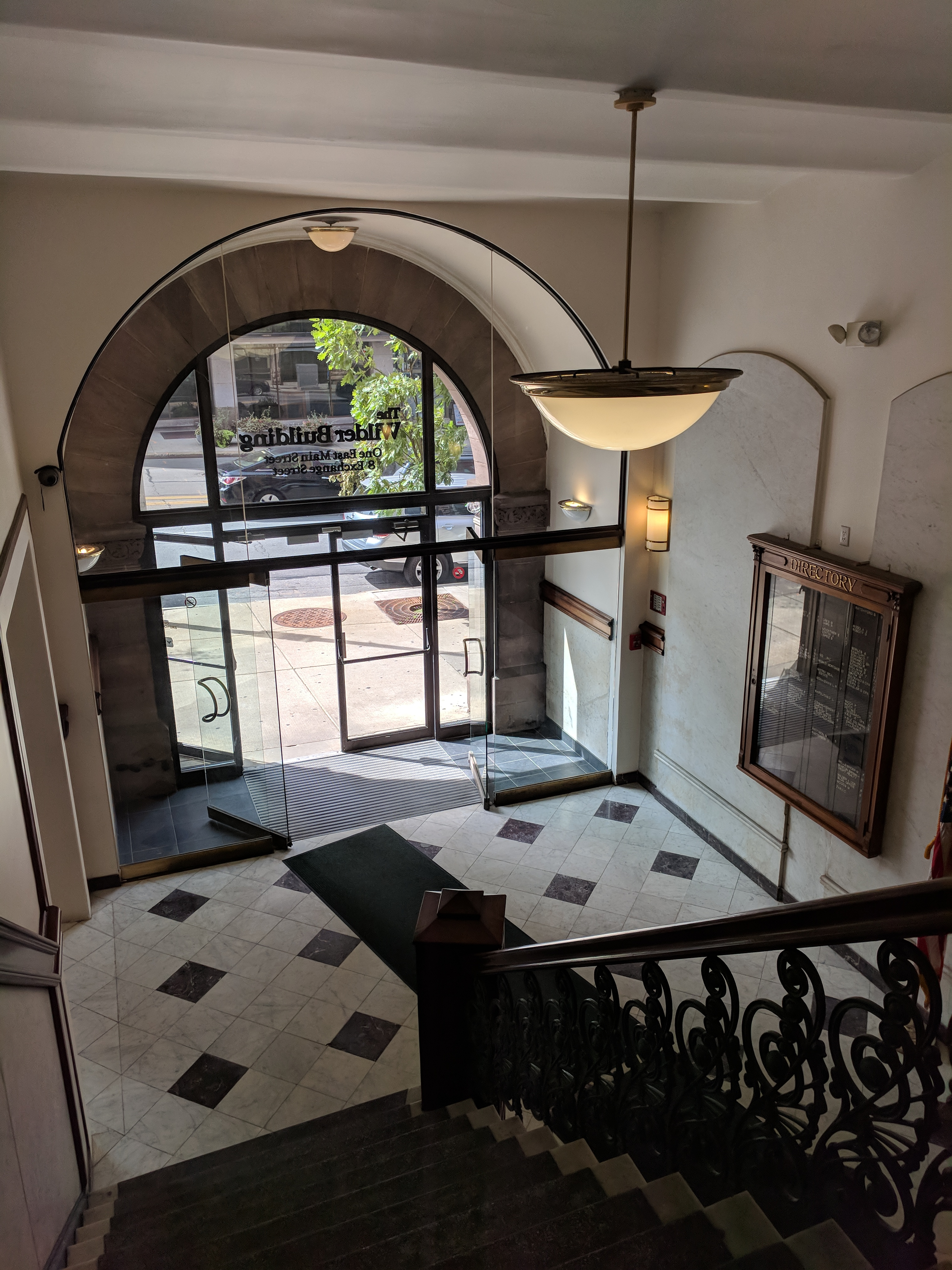

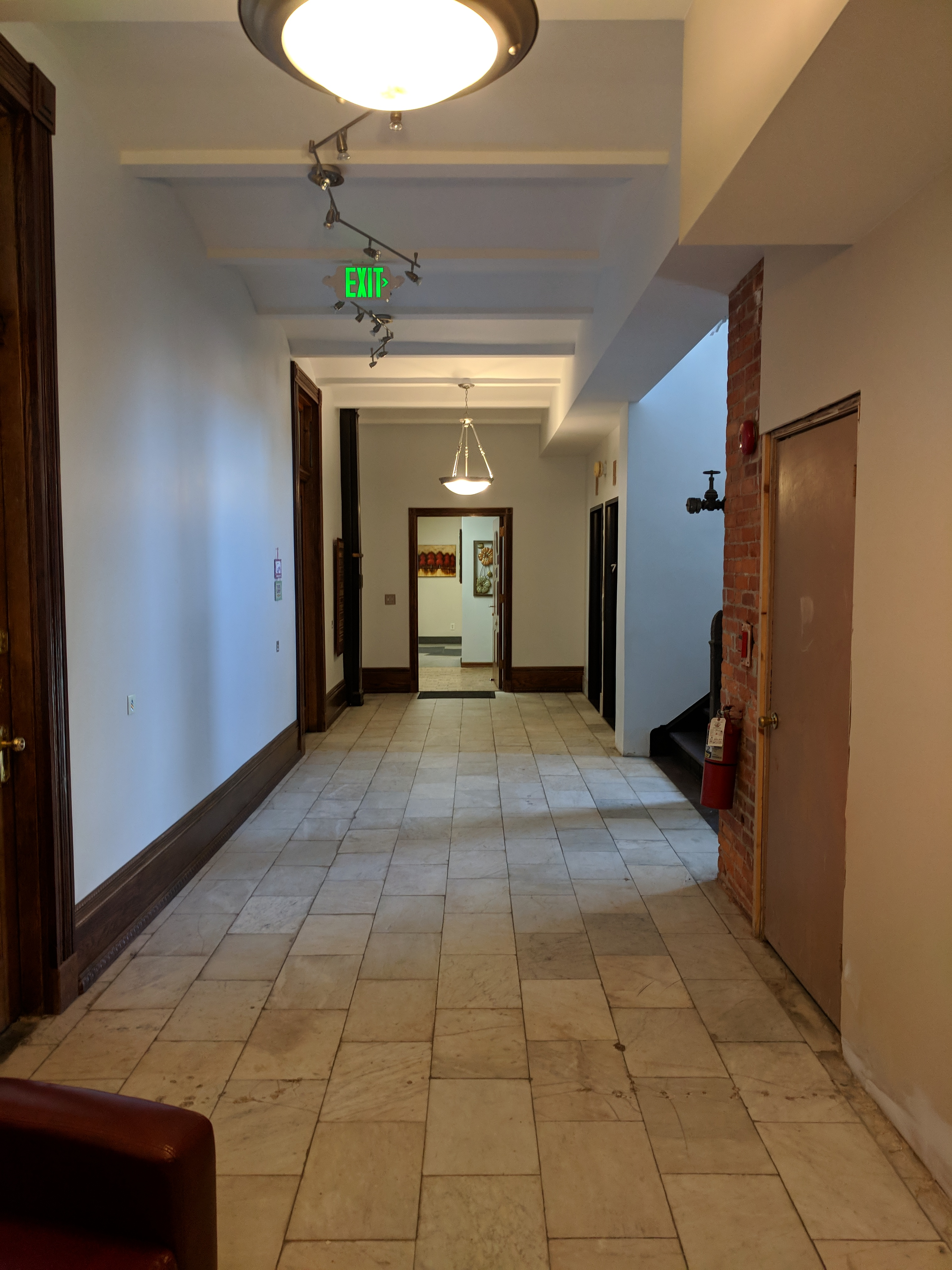

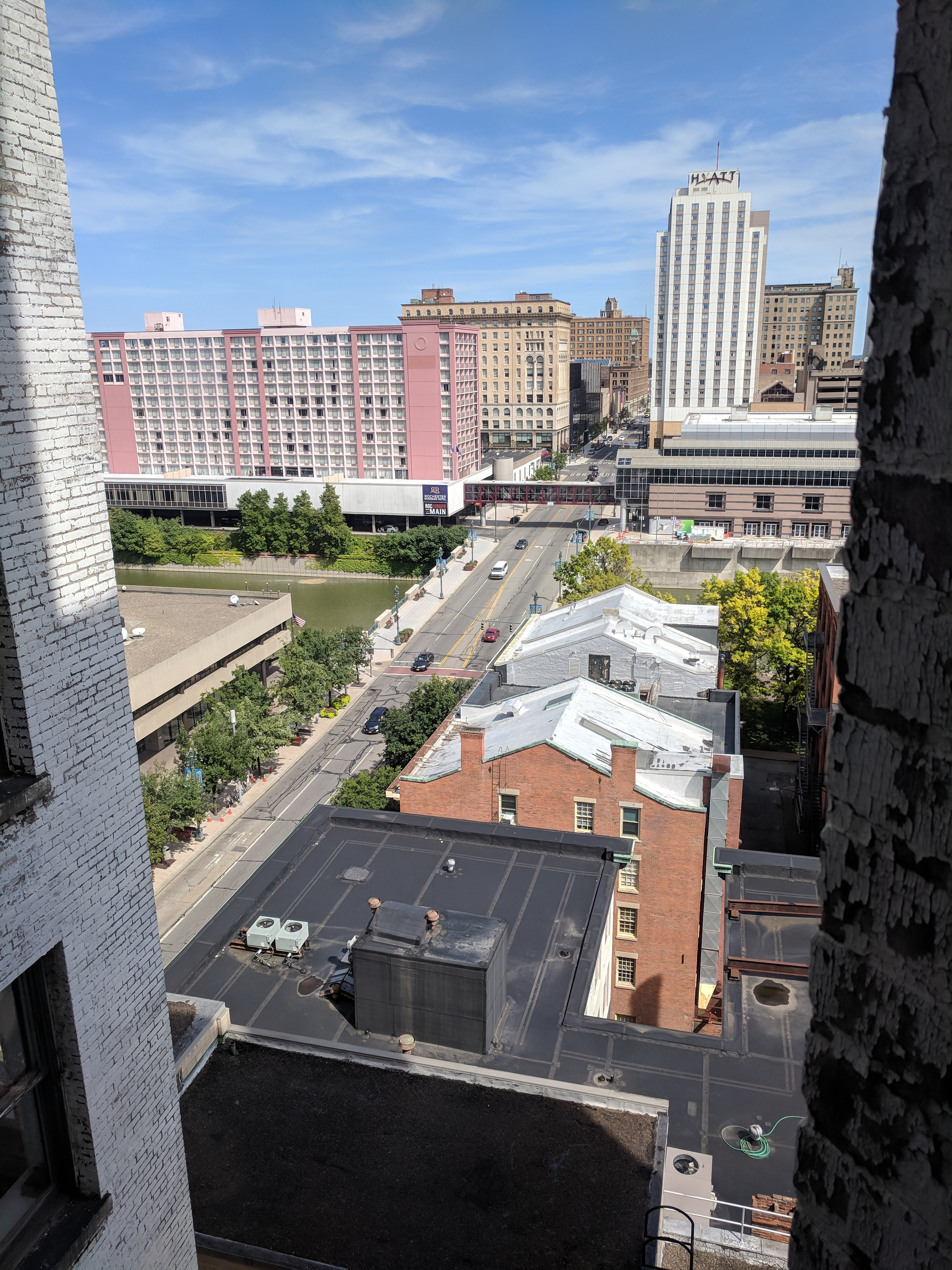
