= Elmwood (Nunda, New York) =

Historic house in New York, United States

- U.S. National Register of Historic Places
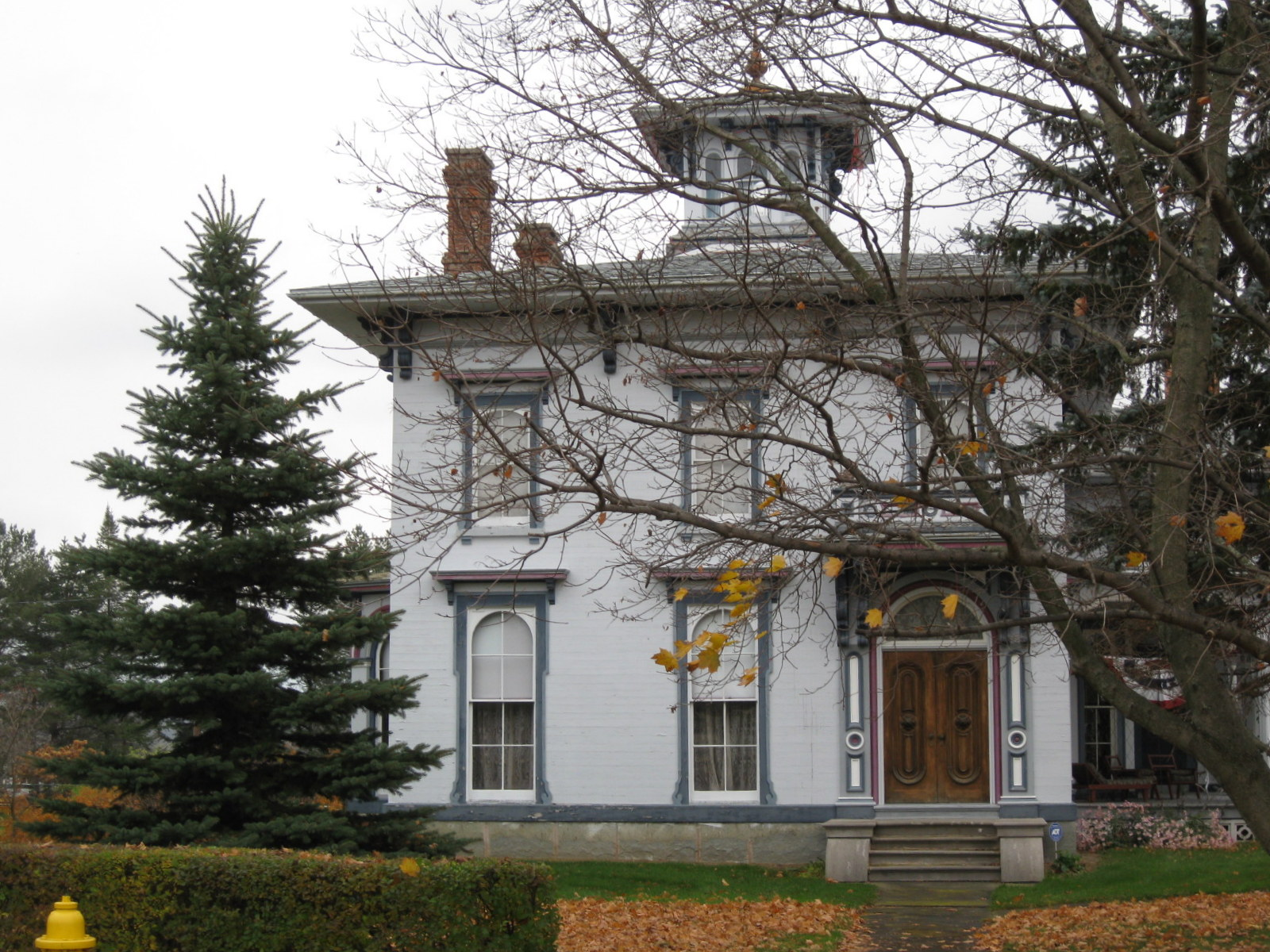
- Elmwood, November 2009

- Location within New York Location within the United States
- Interactive map showing the location of Elmwood
- Location: 19 N. Walnut St., Nunda, New York
- Coordinates: 42°34′56″N 77°56′07″W
- Area: 53.7 acres (21.7 ha)
- Built: c. 1855, 1885, 1891
- Architect: Austin & Warner
- Architectural style: Italianate
- NRHP reference No.: 15000030
- Added to NRHP: February 24, 2015

Elmwood, also known as the William N. Alward House, is a historic home located at Nunda in Livingston County, New York. It was built about 1855 and is a two-story, Italianate style frame dwelling designed by Rochester architects Austin & Warner. It has an overhanging low hipped roof with decorative brackets and topped by a cupola. It features a double wood door entrance with a surround of decorative side panels, ornate brackets and a projecting, decorative wood balconette. Also on the property are contributing two gambrel roofed barns (c. 1885, c. 1890), a fieldstone gas house (c. 1891), a small glass and wood greenhouse, and a small shed and a larger shed/workshop.

It was listed on the National Register of Historic Places in 2015.
