= Dudley Field Malone =

American lawyer, progressive & productor (1882–1950)

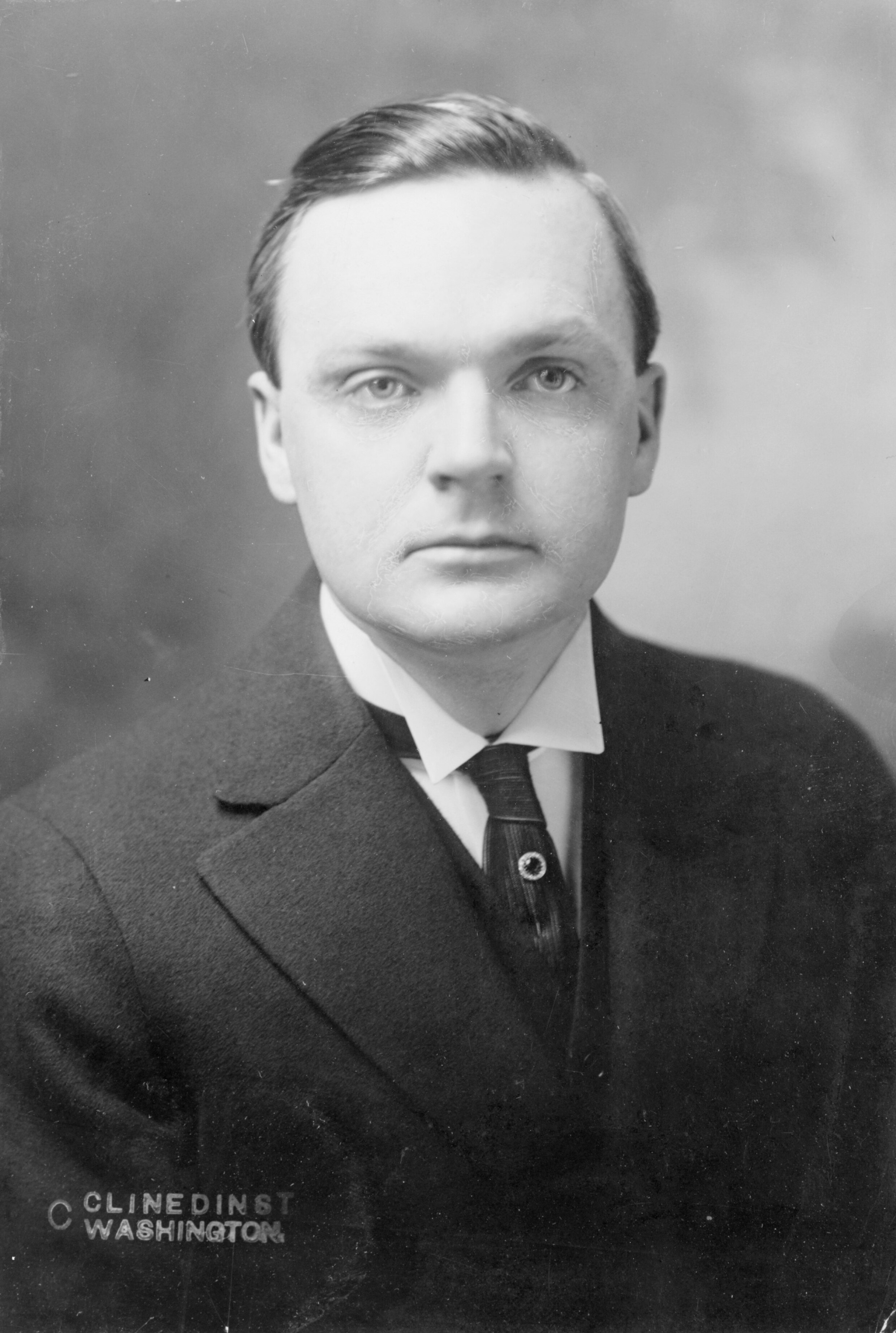
- Portrait by Barnett McFee Clinedinst c. 1913

Collector of the Port of New York
- In office January 1, 1914 – September 8, 1917
- Appointed by: Woodrow Wilson
- Preceded by: John Purroy Mitchel
- Succeeded by: Byron Rufus Newton

Third Assistant Secretary of State
- In office April 22, 1913 – November 22, 1913
- President: Woodrow Wilson
- Preceded by: Chandler Hale
- Succeeded by: William Phillips

Personal details
- Born: June 3, 1882 New York City, U.S.
- Died: October 5, 1950 (aged 68) Culver City, California, U.S.
- Party: Democratic
- Other political affiliations: Farmer–Labor (1920); Progressive (1924)
- Spouses: May Patricia O'Gorman (m. 1908; div. 1921) Doris Stevens (m. 1921; div. 1929) Edna Louise Johnson (m. 1930)
- Parents: William C. Malone; Rose McKenny Malone
- Relatives: James A. O'Gorman (father-in-law)
- Education: College of St. Francis Xavier; Fordham University

Dudley Field Malone (June 3, 1882 – October 5, 1950) was an American attorney, politician, liberal activist, and actor. Malone is best remembered as one of the most prominent liberal attorneys in the United States during the decade of the 1920s and for his unsuccessful 1920 campaign for Governor of New York.

== Early life ==
Malone was born on the West Side of Manhattan on June 3, 1882. He was the son of William C. Malone of New York City,

After being admitted to the bar in 1907, he began practicing law and became active in the Democratic Party in New York, specifically in the reform faction opposed to the Tammany Hall organization. In 1912 he helped organize Woodrow Wilson's successful primary and general election campaign for U.S. president.

== Career ==
Campaign pinback from Malone's 1920 run for governor of New York.

When Wilson took office in 1913, he rewarded Malone by appointing him Third Assistant Secretary of State. Later in 1913, Wilson appointed him Collector of the Port of New York, an important patronage position. As Collector, Malone resisted all efforts by Tammany to use the Collector's office for patronage. He served as Collector until 1917, when he resigned and was succeeded by Byron R. Newton, the former publicity director of Wilson's presidential campaign.

Malone broke decisively with the Wilson administration in the fall of 1917 and publicly endorsed the anti-war Socialist Morris Hillquit for mayor of New York. He was not a member of the Socialist Party of America but found Hillquit's call for an expeditious end to the European war to be compelling and wrote in an open letter to Hillquit:

You, as I understand it, advocate no separate peace for America, but the quickest possible peace that can be negotiated in the interests of the masses of all nations, with no annexations and no punitive indemnities. If this be Socialism, it is also sound Catholicism, Protestantism, Judaism and Americanism.

Malone had become an advocate of women's suffrage and resigned to protest Wilson's failure to take up that issue or to support a Woman Suffrage Amendment to the Constitution. In 1918 he won the release of a group of suffragists jailed during the anti-Wilson Silent Sentinels demonstrations led by Alice Paul. Malone successfully appealed their convictions for "unlawful assembly" for "obstructing the sidewalk" in front of the White House.

In 1920 Malone ran for governor of New York as the candidate of the newly organized Farmer–Labor Party. He received only 69,908 votes out of over 2.8 million cast. That same year, he began to devote himself to his law practice, specializing in international divorce cases of wealthy individuals and becoming known as "the greatest international divorce lawyer." He established a branch office in Paris along with former Judge William H. Wadhams.

In 1920 Malone wrote to President Wilson about the recent false claims of mass rapes committed by French colonial troops in the Rhineland, stating, "Thoughtful persons in America and throughout the world are horrified by the victimization of German women and girls by half-savage African troops."

=== Later legal career ===
In 1925 Malone accepted an invitation to join Clarence Darrow as co-counsel for the defense of John T. Scopes in the famous "Monkey Trial." In response to Bryan's argument against admitting scientific testimony, Malone gave arguably the best speech of the trial in defense of academic freedom. "I have never learned anything from any man who agreed with me" was one of his famous quotes. In 1927 Malone identified as an Independent and wrote an op-ed in The New York Times denouncing Colonel Theodore Roosevelt Jr.'s "attacks on the Governor of this State and your abortive attempts to associate him with any responsibility for commercialized vice."

Malone continued his divorce practice until 1935, when he declared bankruptcy in New York and moved to Westwood, Los Angeles, California. He claimed his debts consisted mostly of sums owed to personal friends, including William K. Vanderbilt, Edward F. Hutton, and the late Otto H. Kahn. He served as counsel to 20th Century Fox and appeared in a few movies as a character actor. As Malone bore a strong resemblance to Winston Churchill, he was called on to play Churchill in the film adaptation of Joseph E. Davies's book, Mission to Moscow (1943).

== Personal life ==
On November 14, 1908, he married May Patricia O'Gorman (1884–1961), the daughter of Judge and U.S. Senator James Aloysius O'Gorman, at the Church of the Ascension on West 107th Street in New York City. May served overseas with the Red Cross during World War I and later worked with Anne Morgan to restore devastated regions in France. After living apart for several years, she obtained a divorce from him in Paris in 1921.

A few months after his divorce, he married the writer and suffragist activist Doris Stevens (1888–1963) on December 9, 1921, in Peekskill, New York. She was the first female member of the American Institute of International Law and first chair of the Inter-American Commission of Women. They also divorced in Paris in October 1929, on the ground of abandonment. "Her plea was based on the alleged impossibility of two persons of equally strong mind living harmoniously together."

On January 29, 1930, in London he married Edna Louise Johnson, an actress whom he had met through the novelist William John Locke. The witnesses at their wedding were Sir William Jowitt, the Attorney General of England, and Lady Cynthia Mosley, a Member of Parliament for Stoke-on-Trent. Before his death in 1950, they were the parents of one son:

- Dudley Field "Shim" Malone Jr. (1931–1990), a theatrical agent and manager.

In July 1949 three brothers attacked him in a "roadside fight," and he suffered a head gash. Malone died on October 5, 1950, in Culver City, California.

== In popular culture ==
Malone is portrayed by Tsilala Brock in the Broadway musical Suffs with book, music, and lyrics by Shaina Taub. Suffs began an open-ended run on at the Music Box Theatre in March 2024 after its off-Broadway premiere at The Public Theatre in March 2022. The musical follows the women's suffrage movement through the ratification of the Nineteenth Amendment. It is produced in part by Hillary Clinton and Malala Yousafzai.

Government offices
Preceded by Chandler Hale	Third Assistant Secretary of State; 1913	Succeeded by William Phillips
