= James Goold Cutler =

American architect and mayor (1848–1927)

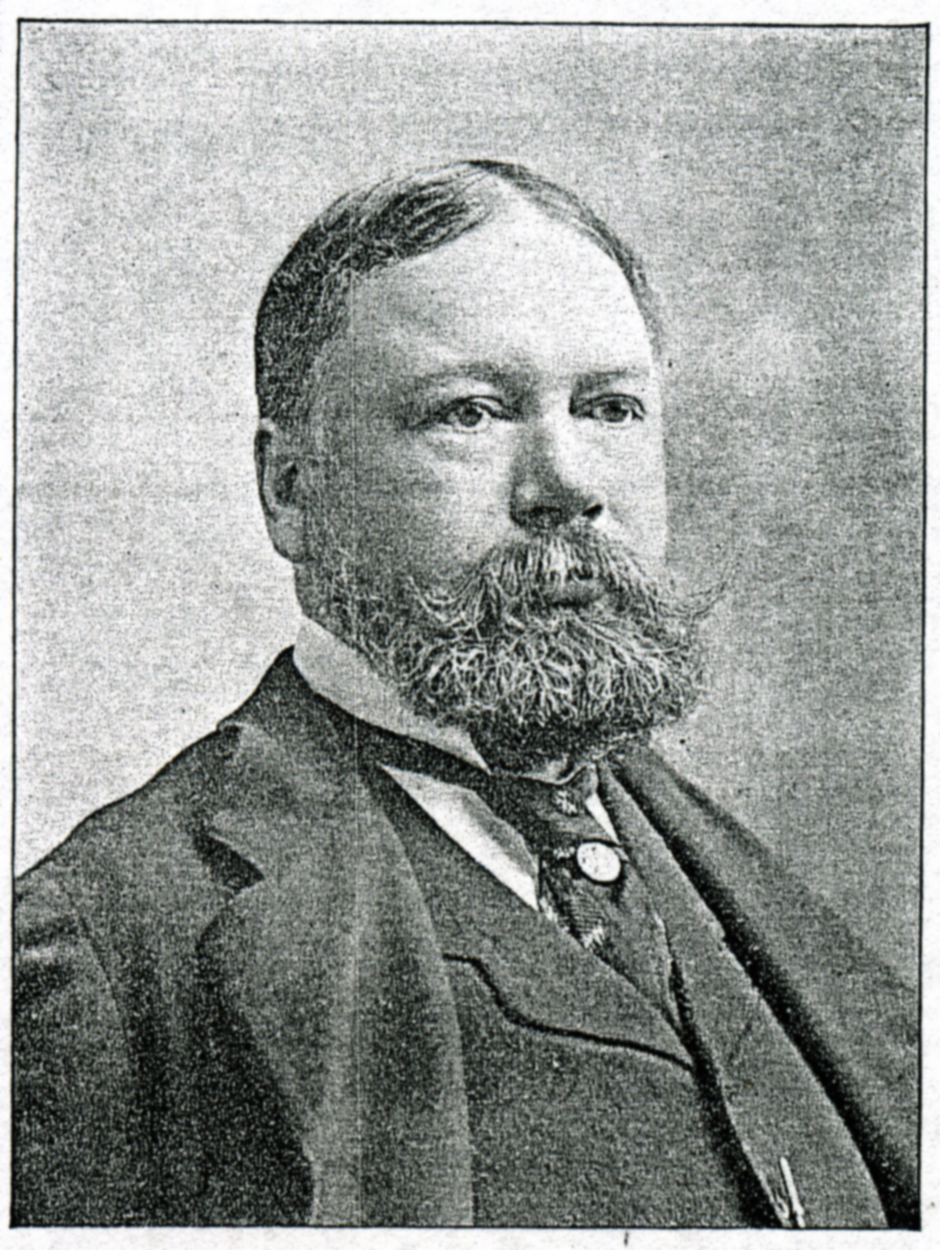

48th Mayor of Rochester, New York
- In office January 1, 1904 – December 31, 1907
- Preceded by: Adolph J. Rodenbeck
- Succeeded by: Hiram H. Edgerton

Personal details
- Born: April 24, 1848 Albany, New York, US
- Died: April 21, 1927 (aged 78) Rochester, New York, US
- Resting place: Mount Hope Cemetery, Rochester
- Party: Republican
- Spouse: Anna Catherine Abbey (m. 1871)
- Profession: Architect
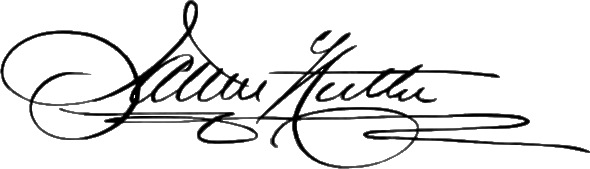
- Signature

James Goold Cutler (April 24, 1848 – April 21, 1927) was a prominent Rochester, New York, architect and businessman, and served as the 48th mayor of Rochester from 1904 to 1907.

== Biography ==
=== Early life and career ===
Cutler was born in 1848 in Albany, New York, to John N. Cutler and Mary E. (Goold) Cutler. On September 27, 1871, he married Anna Catherine Abbey, and in 1872 he and his brother J. W. Cutler moved with their families to the Rochester, New York area. Here he was a practicing architect from 1872 to 1884 in partnership with Andrew Jackson Warner (1833–1910) from 1875 to 1877. He was the inventor of the Cutler mail chute, a mail delivery system for tall buildings, and was associated with his brother, J. W. Cutler, in management of the Cutler Manufacturing company, controlling and operating the Cutler mail chute patents.

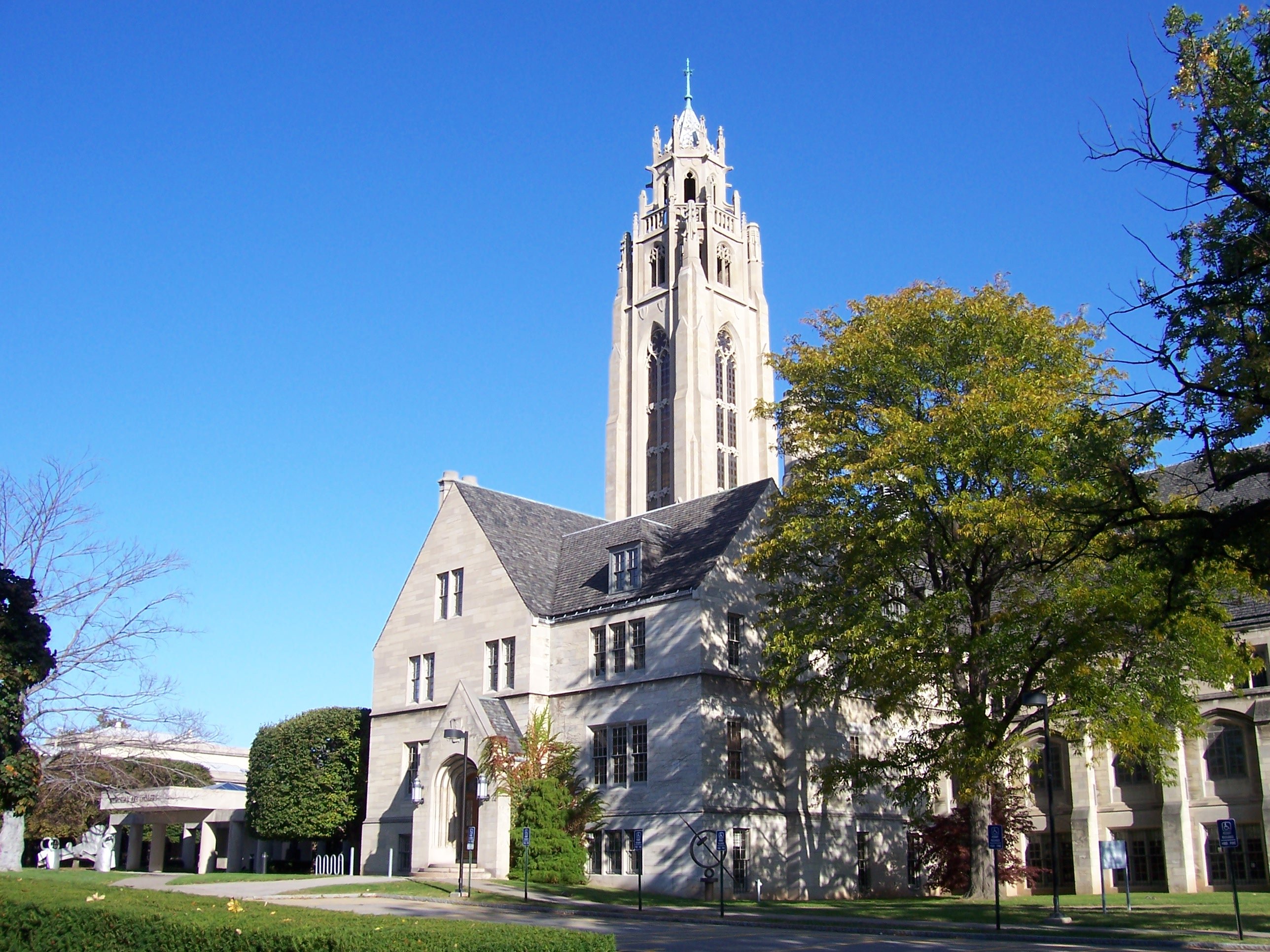
The University of Rochester's Cutler Union as viewed from its southeast side. The Union was made possible by a bequest from the Cutlers.

=== Political career ===
Cutler was a Republican presidential elector for New York State in 1896. In 1904, he was recruited by Republican boss George Aldridge to run for mayor against former mayor George E. Warner, a Democrat and comptroller James Johnston, a Republican running for the new Citizen's Party. Cutler narrowly won the election. As mayor, he oversaw major expansions of all municipal services. In his first four months, nearly one million dollars were spent on new fire fighting equipment, police precincts, hospitals, garbage collection facilities, and other improvements. Later in his term, he focused his attention on expanding the city's electric grid and street lights. He was reelected in 1905, but lost the Republican nomination to Hiram Edgerton in 1907.

=== Death ===
Cutler died on April 21, 1927, in Rochester and was eulogized by his many friends, including former U.S. president William Howard Taft, former governor of New York Charles Evans Hughes and former presidential candidate John W. Davis.

Political offices
Preceded by Adolph J. Rodenbeck	Mayor of Rochester, NY; 1904–1907	Succeeded by Hiram H. Edgerton
