= First Presbyterian Church (Rochester, New York) =

Historic church in New York, United States

- U.S. National Register of Historic Places
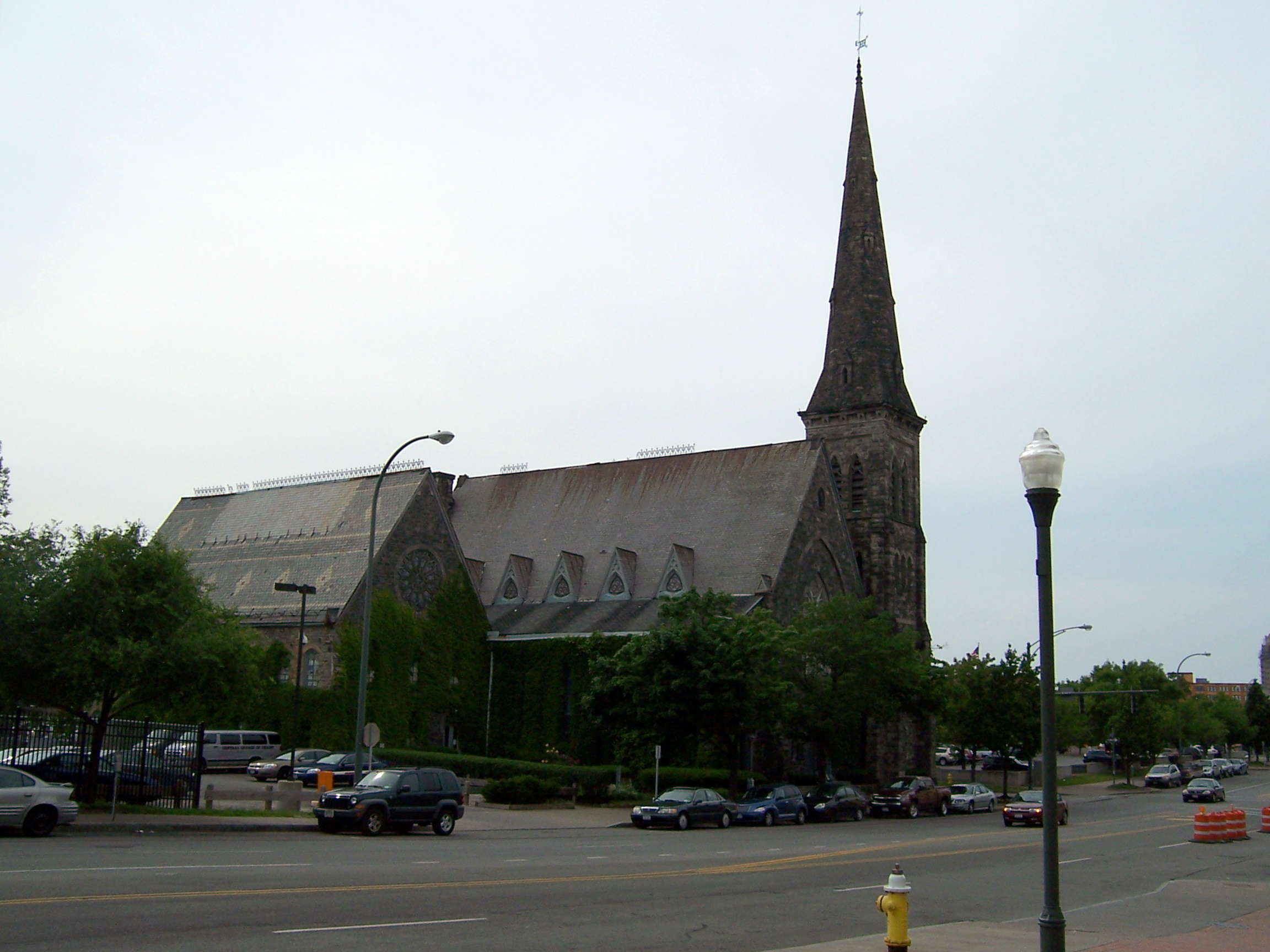
- The First Presbyterian Church in June 2010

- Location within New York Location within the United States
- Location: 101 S. Plymouth Ave., Rochester, New York
- Coordinates: 43°9′10″N 77°36′56″W
- Area: less than one acre
- Built: 1871
- Architect: Warner, Andrew J.
- Architectural style: Gothic
- MPS: Inner Loop MRA
- NRHP reference No.: 73001202
- Added to NRHP: October 25, 1973

First Presbyterian Church is a historic Presbyterian church located at Rochester in Monroe County, New York. It is a Gothic Revival–style edifice designed in 1871 by Rochester architect Andrew Jackson Warner. It is built of Albion sandstone and trimmed with white Medina sandstone. It features a single stone bell tower and spire at the northeast corner beside the main entrance. It was the third home for Rochester's oldest congregation. It is now home to the Central Church of Christ.

It was listed on the National Register of Historic Places in 1973.
