= Jean Giambrone =

American sports writer

- Born: Virginia Cardinale; May 6, 1921; Rochester, New York, United States
- Died: January 21, 2013 (aged 91); Greece, New York, United States
- Resting place: Holy Sepulchre Cemetery; 43°12′46″N 77°38′02″W
- Occupation: Sports writer
- Known for: First woman awarded full press credentials at the Masters Tournament in Augusta, Georgia
- Spouse: Charlie Giambrone (m. 1946; died 1995)
- Children: Two

Virginia "Jean" Giambrone (May 6, 1921 – January 21, 2013) was an American sports writer, who became the first woman to be awarded full press credentials at the Masters Tournament in Augusta, Georgia. Jack Nicklaus called her "a true professional in her craft", while former colleagues noted her impact on women's athletics and journalism: Scott Pitoniak opined that "Every current female athlete, coach and administrator really owes her a debt of gratitude," while Bob Matthews called her "the best friend women sports people in Rochester ever had."

== Education and career ==
Born Virginia Cardinale in 1921 in Rochester, New York, Giambrone later graduated from the University of Rochester, where she majored in government. While a sophomore there in 1939, she went to the Democrat and Chronicle newspaper and complained to sports editor Elliot Cushing that female athletes were not being given proper coverage, saying that she was "tired of reading about men all the time." Cushing immediately hired her, and she began covering women's sports part-time while attending college.

After graduating, she had planned on training for management at the Rochester Products Division for General Motors. However, Joe Adams, the managing editor of the Rochester Times-Union, asked her to be a city news reporter. She accepted.

In the late 1940s, after four years of writing news stories, she returned to sports writing. She was offered a full-time position, but turned it down, putting family first. She covered many sporting venues but golf and bowling were her favorites. In 1950, she became a member of the Locust Hill Country Club, playing golf there until her death in 2013 and becoming a four-time club champion over the years. She was also a women's club champion at Genesee Valley Park, as well as a multiple winner of the Women's Rochester District Golf Association tournament.

== Personal life ==
While working for the Times-Union in the 1940s, she was asked to mail a letter to Charlie Giambrone, a military policeman stationed in New Orleans. Charlie later came home on leave and asked Jean on a date. The two married on May 15, 1946, and settled in Irondequoit, New York to raise two children. She left the Times-Union in 1981 to spend more time with her family. Charlie died in 1995, and Jean died at the Unity Hospital in Greece, New York, on January 21, 2013, as a result of a blood clot in her lung.

== Journalism highlights ==
- In 1966, she was banned from the media tent at the Masters Tournament, held at the then-men-only Augusta National. She told Associated Press writer Will Grimsley she was there to write for Gannett about the event, not "the dresses the players' wives were wearing." Grimsley and other writers spoke to tournament officials on her behalf. The following year, she was allowed full press access, the first female sports writer to have that privilege.
- At the 1967 U.S. Open, Giambrone overheard golf rookie Lee Trevino tell friends he had finished four practice rounds of par golf. Trevino added "Do you know what four rounds like that could do for my career this week?" Giambrone decided to accompany Trevino for the duration of the tournament, writing on his progress; he ended up finishing fifth. In 1968, he won his first major title at the Open in Giambrone's hometown of Rochester and allowed her to ask the first question from the media.
