= Andrew Jackson Warner =

American architect (1833-1910)

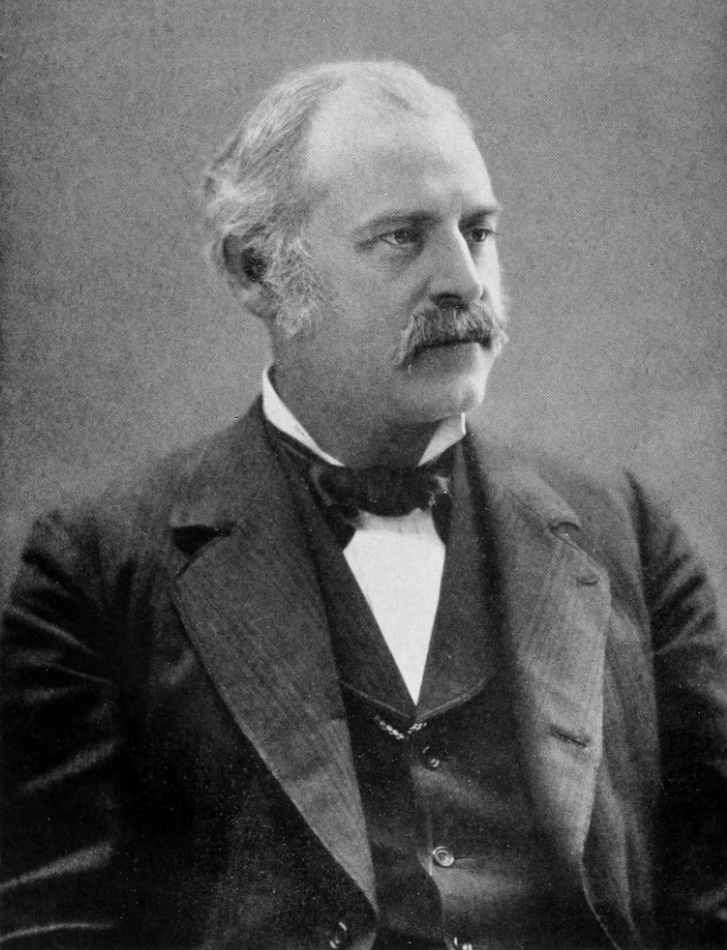
- Born: March 17, 1833; New Haven, Connecticut
- Died: September 4, 1910 (aged 77); Rochester, New York
- Burial place: Mount Hope Cemetery
- Occupation: Architect
- Spouse: Catherine Pardee Foster (m. 1955)
- Children: William Amos Warner; John Foster Warner

Andrew Jackson Warner (March 17, 1833 – September 4, 1910), also known as A. J. Warner, was a prominent architect in Rochester, New York.

== Early life ==
Warner was born in New Haven, Connecticut on March 17, 1833, a son of Amos Warner Jr. and Adah (née Austin) Warner. His paternal grandfather was Amos Warner, who fought in the American Revolutionary War. He was educated at Guilford Academy in Guilford, Connecticut.

== Career ==
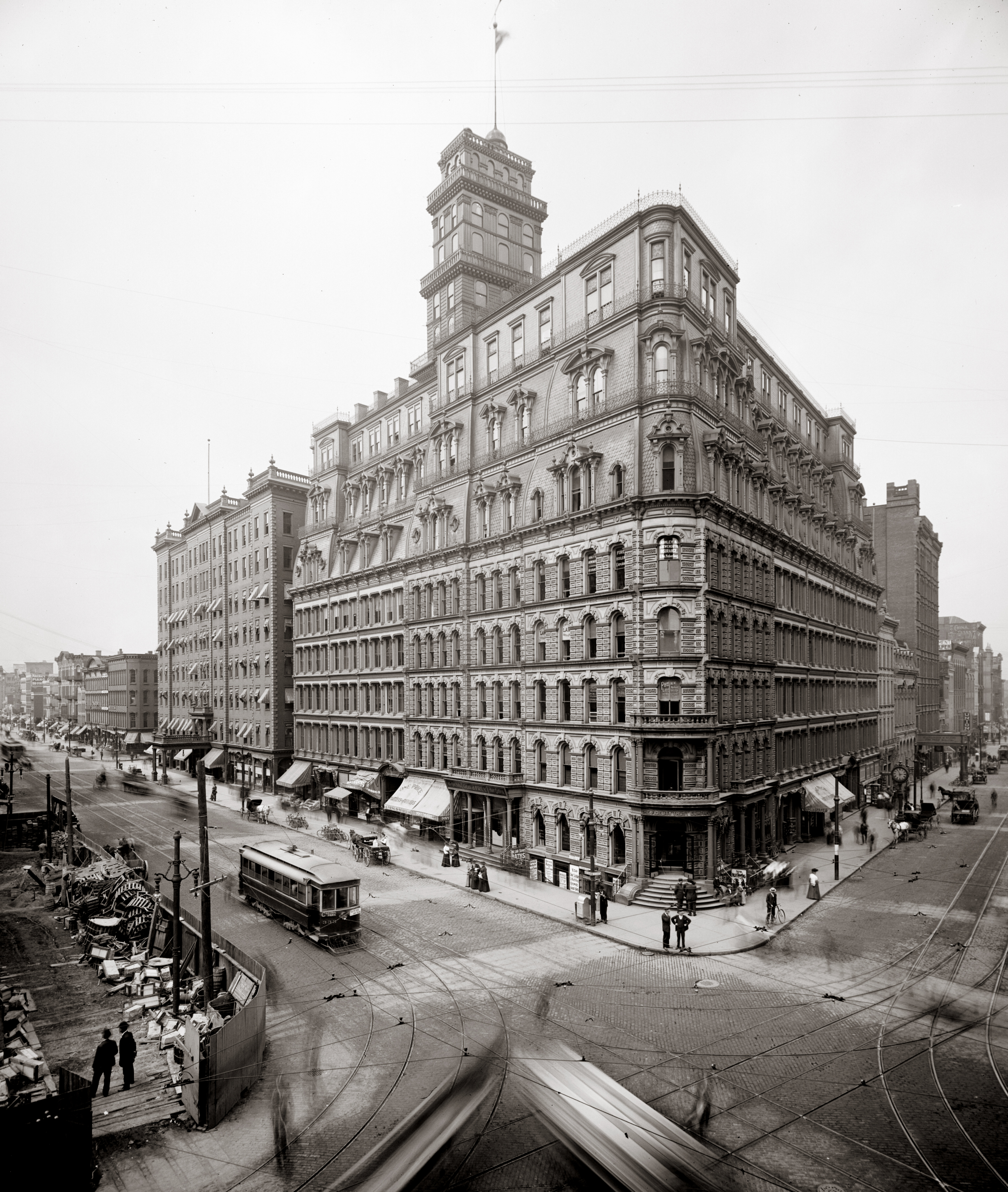
Powers Building, 1869

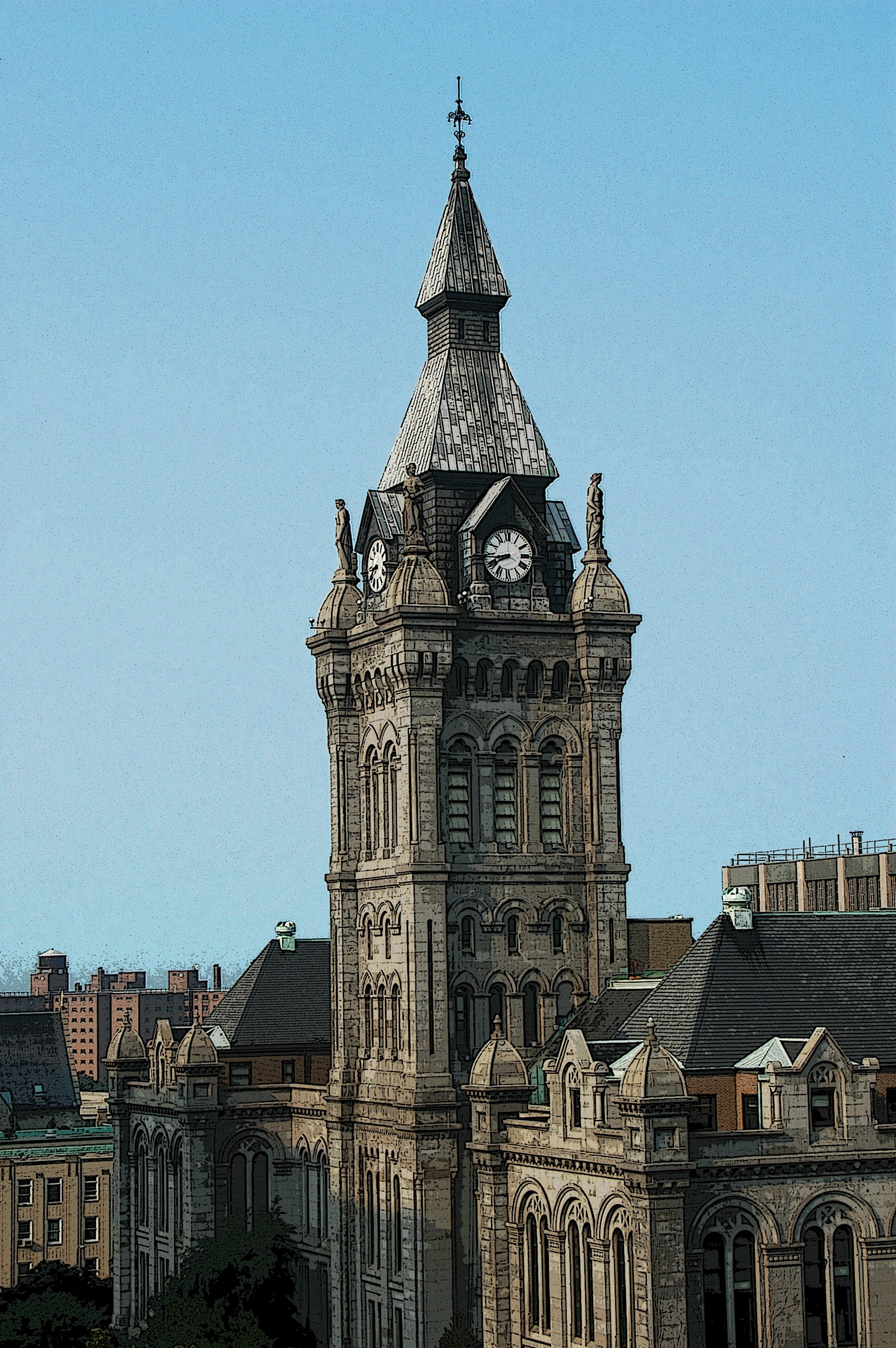
Erie County and Buffalo City Hall, 1871

In 1847, he came to Rochester as an apprentice to one of his uncles, Merwin Austin, for whom he worked as a draftsman. He was soon made a partner in his uncle's business, which as Austin & Warner existed from about 1855 to 1858. Warner then established an independent practice until 1867 when he partnered with Charles Coots under the firm name of Andrew J. Warner & Co. After this he had an independent practice, then from 1875 to 1877 partnered with James Goold Cutler (1848-1927) in a firm known as Warner & Cutler.

== Personal life ==
Warner was married to Catherine Pardee Foster (1834–1921), the daughter of Jonathan Foster and Hulda (née Griffin) Foster, on March 22, 1955. Together, they were the parents of two sons:

- William Amos Warner (1855–1917)
- John Foster Warner (1859–1937), who was also an architect who married Mary Adams (1859–1943).

Warner died in Rochester on September 4, 1910, and is buried in Mount Hope Cemetery.

== Selected works ==
- c. 1855: Elmwood, Nunda, New York, listed on the National Register of Historic Places in 2015.
- 1860: Brick Presbyterian Church Complex, Rochester, New York, listed on the National Register of Historic Places in 1992.
- 1860s: United Church of Warsaw, located in the Warsaw Downtown Historic District.
- 1863: St. Mary's Hospital, Rochester, New York
- 1864-1868: St. Patrick's Cathedral (as clerk of the works), Rochester, New York
- 1867: Richardson-Bates House, Oswego, New York, listed on the National Register of Historic Places in 1975.
- 1868: Our Lady of Victory Roman Catholic Church, Rochester, New York, listed on the National Register of Historic Places in 1992.
- 1869: Powers Building, Rochester, New York, listed on the National Register of Historic Places in 1976.
- 1870: H. H. Richardson Complex, supervising architect for Henry Hobson Richardson, Buffalo, New York.
- 1871: Erie County and Buffalo City Hall, Buffalo, New York, listed on the National Register of Historic Places in 1976.
- 1871: First Presbyterian Church (Rochester, New York), listed on the National Register of Historic Places in 1973.
- 1873-1875: Rochester City Hall, Rochester, New York
- 1883: First Presbyterian Church of Mumford, Mumford, New York, listed on the National Register of Historic Places in 2002.
- 1887-1888: Wilder Building, Rochester, New York, listed on the National Register of Historic Places in 1985.
- 1888: Ellwanger & Barry Building, (Rochester, New York)
- 1891: Saint Bernard's Seminary, Rochester, New York, Rochester, New York, listed on the National Register of Historic Places in 1996.
- 1892: Willard Memorial Chapel-Welch Memorial Hall, Auburn, New York, listed on the National Register of Historic Places in 1989, designated National Historic Landmark in 2005.
- 1893: Corning City Hall, Corning, New York
- 1893: Masonic Temple, Olean, New York, located in the Union and State Streets Historic District.
- 1893: Downs Hotel/Hotel Holley, Holley, New York, located in the Holley Village Historic District.
