= George Washington Aldridge Sr. =

American politician

George Washington Aldridge Sr. (November 3, 1833 – December 8, 1877) was a New York politician. He was the Mayor of Rochester, New York from 1873 to 1874.
