= Eastern Victory =

Saxon Motor Car Company roadster owned by Anna Howard Shaw

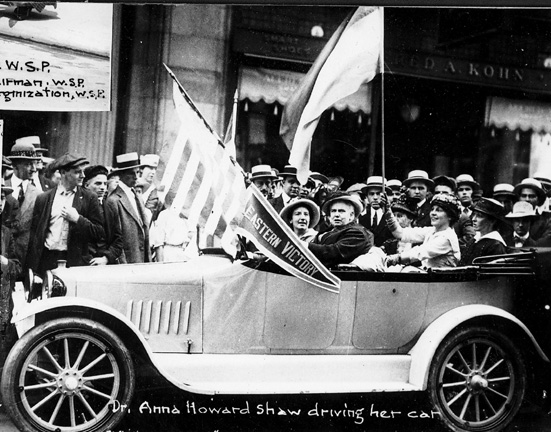
Anna Howard Shaw in Eastern Victory c. 1915

Eastern Victory was a Saxon Motor Car Company roadster purchased for Anna Howard Shaw in 1915. It was bright yellow and named "Eastern Victory" by Shaw. Shortly after the car was given to Shaw, it was seized to pay for Shaw's unpaid taxes. The car would be auctioned to pay for the taxes. At the auction, suffragists from Delaware County, Pennsylvania purchased the car. The car made appearances in New Jersey and Georgia suffrage events.

== History ==
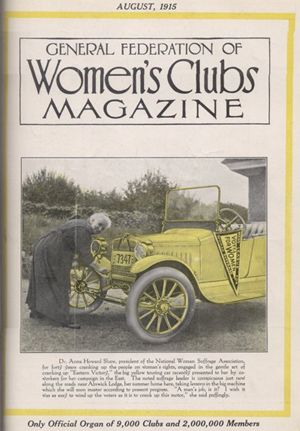
General Federation of Women's Clubs Magazine, Anna Howard Shaw, August 1915

Shaw received the yellow car from Harriet Burton Laidlaw on June 29, 1915. Shaw was brought into New York City believing she was attending an important meeting, but instead was given the car, a Saxon Roadster, dubbed "Eastern Victory.". It was a gift of New York suffragists.

After receiving the car, she and Aimee Hutchinson drove to her home in Moylan, Pennsylvania. In Moylan, Shaw learned to drive the car and crank the engine. Shaw said of cranking the engine: "A man's job is it? I just wish it was as easy to wind up the voters and make them go right on November 2. Let me tell you, sir, to a woman who has been cranking up suffrage forty years, playing with a little toy like this has no terrors."

=== Car seizure ===
Shaw resisted paying taxes on her property in Pennsylvania in 1913. It was a form of "passive protest" against the government which was not allowing women to vote, but still taxing their property. Shaw refused to fill out the form listing her property, stocks, and bonds, and in response, the tax assessor evaluated her property at a hugely inflated amount. It was estimated that she owed $126 in taxes based on this assessment. Shaw then tried to send in her revised property listing, but it was rejected. Shaw then changed her address to New York state. Changing her address protected most of her property.

Eastern Victory was seized while Shaw was at home and the car in the garage. After the car was seized by tax officials, Shaw's lawyer instituted equity proceedings to stop authorities from selling the car at auction. If she paid the $126 tax, authorities would return Eastern Victory to Shaw, but Shaw refused. Seizing the car made it a symbol of the fight for women's suffrage in the United States.

Before the car went to auction, suffragists and anti-suffragists started raising money to buy the car. Anti-suffragists revealed they had raised $500 before the auction. Suffragists in Delaware County, Pennsylvania were able to buy the car for $230.

Shortly after the car was bought at auction, suffragists Anna Hutchinson and Beatrice Murphy had an accident in Nyack, New York while driving the car. It went into a ditch, drove through a barbed wire fence and hit a telegraph pole. The suffragists were not harmed, and the car went to a mechanic to fix.

=== Eastern Victory No. 2 ===
In August 1915, Shaw received a larger yellow roadster dubbed "Eastern Victory No. 2."

== Appearances ==
Lucy Anthony gave a speech at the Ho-ho-kus Fair standing in Eastern Victory in September 1915. The car appeared in a Georgia suffrage parade in November 1915. Georgia suffragist, Eléonore Raoul, drove Eastern Victory from New York City to Georgia for the parade.
