= Ordination of women in Methodism =

Practice in some Christian denominations

The ordination of women has been commonly practiced in Methodist denominations since the 20th century, although some denominations earlier allowed women to preach.

Historically, as in other Christian denominations, many Methodist churches did not permit women to preach or exercise authority over men. However, earlier in the 18th century, Methodist founder John Wesley did give his approbation to a few "extraordinarily called" women to preach within limited contexts, including Sarah Crosby. In Britain, the Primitive Methodist Church always allowed the ordination of women to full-time ministry. The Primitive Methodists had full equal roles for men and women, but the Wesleyan Methodist Church only ordained its first deaconess in 1890. After the Methodist Union, the British Methodist Church resumed ordaining women as presbyters (elders) in 1974.

Other Methodist denominations that practice the ordination of women include the United Methodist Church (UMC), in which the ordination of women as deacons and elders has occurred since its creation in 1968, and its splinter denomination, the Global Methodist Church, since it was established in 2022. The Free Methodist Church (FMC) ordained its first woman deacon in 1911. The Allegheny Wesleyan Methodist Connection ordained its first female elder in 1853, and the Bible Methodist Connection of Churches has always ordained women to the presbyterate and diaconate. Some smaller Methodist denominations do not ordain women, such as the Southern Methodist Church (SMC), Evangelical Methodist Church of America, Fundamental Methodist Conference, Evangelical Wesleyan Church, and Primitive Methodist Church of the United States (Distinct from the earlier British church with the same name) - the latter two of which do not ordain women as elders nor do they license them as pastors or local preachers. The EWC and PMC do, however, consecrate women as deaconesses. Some of the groups that later became part of the United Methodist Church started ordaining women in the late 19th century, but the largest group, the Methodist Church (USA), did not grant women full clergy rights until 1956.

== History ==
=== John Wesley's views on women ===
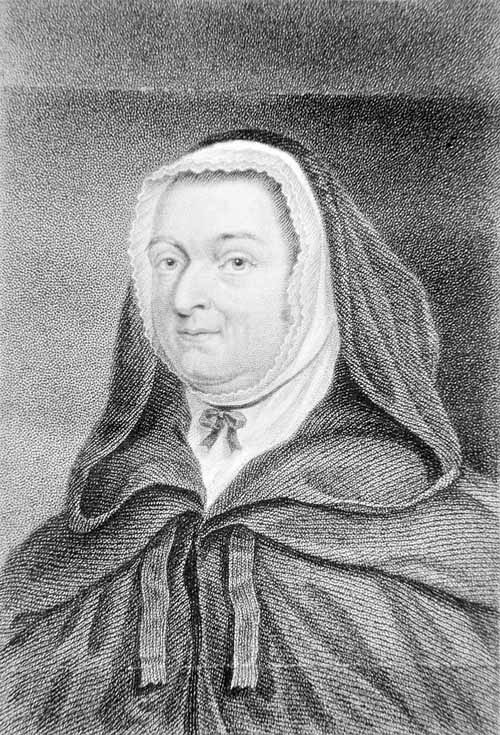
Mary Bosanquet Fletcher, who helped convince John Wesley to allow some women to preach in Methodism

John Wesley, the founder of the Methodist movement, was the first within his movement to authorize a woman to preach, but with limitations. In 1761, he told Sarah Crosby in a personal letter that she had not been out of place to speak to everyone at once in a female class meeting, instead of giving personal instruction to each one individually, when 200 people unexpectedly showed up.

Mary Bosanquet sought Wesley's "advice and direction" in the summer of 1771 whether she was correct in feeling that certain women with "extraordinary calling" were doing right to "intreat sinners to come to Jesus" if the woman avoided "tak[ing] authority over her husband," "medd[ling] with church discipline," and "regulat[ing] matters of the church" at prayer meetings at her orphanage, Cross Hall. Bosanquet's letter to Wesley is considered by some to be the first full and true defense of women's preaching in Methodism. Her argument was that women should be able to preach when they experienced an "extraordinary call", or when given permission by God. Wesley accepted this idea, saying, "I think the strength of your cause rests there, on having an Extraordinary Call." He wrote to Crosby that he still held to the biblical rule of women keeping silence in the churches, but that "only we believe it admits of some exceptions." Later, Wesley also approved of other women as preachers, including Grace Murray, Sarah Taft, Hannah Ball and Elizabeth Ritchie.

In spite of these "extraordinary" exceptions, John Wesley never came to the place of accepting the preaching of women in the life of the church as ordinary. Each case was judged individually, based upon the capabilities and gifts of the woman. John wrote to George Robinson in 1780:

I desire Mr. Peacock to put a final stop to the preaching of women in his circuit. If it were suffered, it would grow, and we know not where it would end."

Author Paul Chilcote notes that, "[Wesley] could never allow the exceptional to become a general rule."

Wesley's appreciation for the importance of women in the church has been credited to his mother, Susanna Wesley. It is said that she instilled in him, and in his brother Charles Wesley, a fellow preacher in the movement, a deep appreciation for the intellectual and spiritual qualities of women. Susanna Wesley and other women in the early Methodist movement helped to evangelize and were active members in Methodist activities included leading female band and class meetings, raising funds for the Methodist causes, and managing educational institutions.

A portion of John Wesley's view on women can be found in his 1786 sermon "On Visiting the Sick" (Sermon 98). In the sermon, he attacks those who totally ignore a woman's value, opinions, and feelings:

It has long passed for a maxim with many that "women are only to be seen but not heard". And accordingly many of them are brought up in such a manner as if they were only designed for agreeable playthings! No, it is the deepest unkindness; it is horrid cruelty; it is mere Turkish barbarity. And I know not how any women of sense and spirit can submit to it.

=== Later Methodism ===
After John Wesley's death in 1791, several splits happened within the Methodist movement. In North America, the Methodist Protestant Church split from the Methodist Episcopal Church in 1828 and, later in 1844, the Methodist Episcopal Church, South split, leaving a separate Methodist Episcopal Church of the north. The Methodist Episcopal Church had previously experienced schism, with the departure of some individuals in 1841 that resulted in the formation of the Wesleyan Methodist Church, out of which the Bible Methodist Connection of Churches was created in 1968. The Methodist Episcopal Church, South also gave rise to other denominations that split from it, such as the Congregational Methodist Church in 1852 and the Southern Methodist Church in 1940.

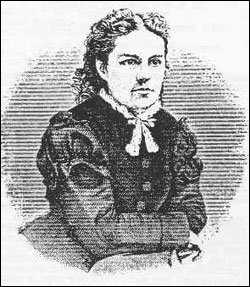
Anna Oliver

Some spinoff Methodist denominations later began to warm to the idea of officially licensed women preachers. In 1866, for example, Helenor Davidson was a circuit rider for the Methodist Protestant Church in Jasper County, Indiana. She later became the first ordained minister of any Methodist denomination. Starting at the end of the 19th century, the Methodist Protestant Church had not only begun to ordain women, but had also granted them full rights as clergy.

This was not the case for all denominations. During the next decades, the Methodist Episcopal Church reversed many practices, and publicly emphasized the domestic role of women, refusing to acknowledge their more public role as church leaders and preachers.

In 1880, despite support from the Alumni of the Theological School of Boston University, the General Conference of the Methodist Episcopal Church refused to ordain many of the female graduates. Some of the reasons given for this refusal were:

1. Theological objections that interpreted First Corinthians 14:34–35 to mean that women should be silent in church.
2. Socio-cultural objections including the status of both white women and women of color in Western society, the home and workplace
3. Church policy, when Bishop Edward G. Andrews of the General Conference of the Methodist Episcopal Church of New England said ordination of women was "unlawful." In his opinion, the law of the church did not authorize the ordination of women.

It was for the latter reason that Anna Oliver was not ordained in 1880 despite the fact she had graduated from Boston University School of Theology in 1876, and had served two churches with obvious success. In response, Anna Oliver and her supporters lobbied the General Conference to have all distinctions on the basis of gender removed from the Book of Discipline regarding status for ordination. Anna Oliver prepared pamphlets in which she outlined the reasons to remove the gender basis for ordination; such as the natural gifts and fruit of women to pastor, the sacramental needs of the mission field, the demands of charity, the Golden Rule and appeals to what John Wesley would do. In response, the General Conference not only denied the motion to remove the gender basis from ordination in the Book of Discipline, they revoked the licenses to preach of all those women who currently held them. The influential minister James Monroe Buckley argued against her saying, "I am opposed to inviting any woman to preach before this meeting. If the mother of our Lord were on earth, I should oppose her preaching here. ... There is no power in the Methodist Church by which a woman can be licensed to preach".

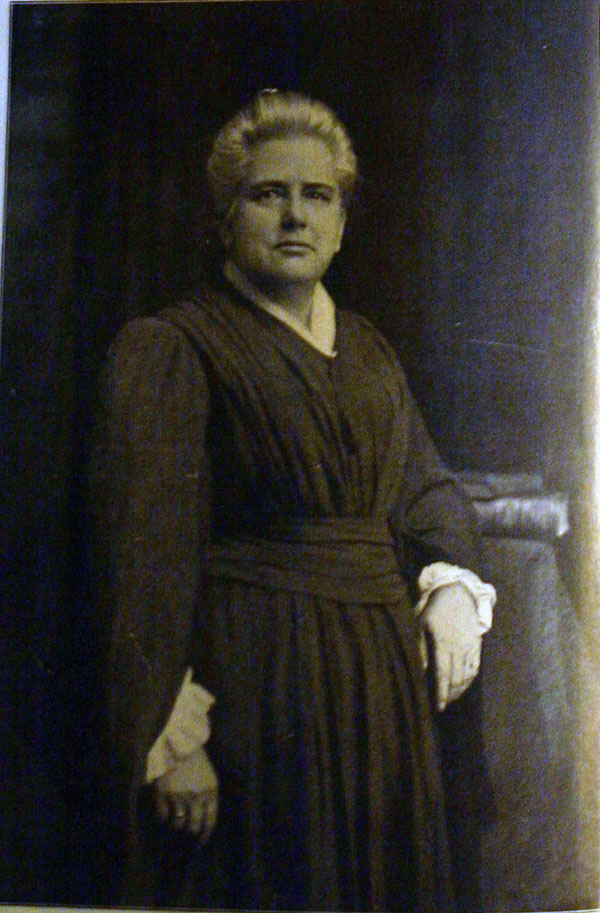
Anna Shaw

Two years later, Anna Howard Shaw, who received her theological degree in 1878, was denied ordination by her presiding bishop, who felt that there was no place for women in the ordained ministry of the Methodist Episcopal Church. She left the church and was ordained in the Methodist Protestant Church that same year. She later went to be an activist in women's suffrage, and her advocacy contributed to women eventually gaining the right to vote, although she died before the 19th amendment was passed.

Margaret Newton Van Cott, an American Methodist preacher born in 1830, devoted her life to evangelism and holding revival meetings across the country.

Walter Ashbel Sellew championed the ordination of women in Methodism and in 1894, he published Why Not?: A Plea for the Ordination of Those Women Whom God Has Called to Preach the Gospel. Sellew was the primary architect of the resolution in the Free Methodist Church that led to the ordination of women as deacons in 1911, which read: "Whenever any annual conference shall be satisfied that any woman is called of God to preach the gospel, that annual conference may be permitted to receive her on trial, and into full connection, and ordain her as a deacon, all on the same conditions as we receive men into the same relations."

In 1924 The Methodist Episcopal Church granted women the right to be ordained as local deacons and elders. The Rev. Belle Carter Harmon of Montana was the first woman to be ordained a local deacon in the Methodist Episcopal Church, on 31 August 1924 at Helena, Montana. Aurelia L. McAllister was ordained a local deacon the same day.

In 1939, the Methodist Protestant Church (with the exception of the Mississippi Conference that continued the Methodist Protestant Church), the Methodist Episcopal Church and the Methodist Episcopal Church, South merged, forming the Methodist Church. In the Methodist Church, women from the Methodist Episcopal Church-South gained the right to ordination, while the Methodist Protestant women gave up full clergy rights in the merger. The rationalization of this move was said to be that the new denomination already faced sufficient problems. The Louisiana Conference, for example, had five women who had recently been ordained, Fern Cook, Nettie Mae Cook, Lea Joyner, Elaine Willett, and Anna Ruth Nuttall. The newly formed Methodist Church recognized their ordination and accepted them into the conference, yet offered only a few actual appointments. By 1945, only three of the five remained in the conference. One of these, Lea Joyner, was never given an official appointment. She was told, "No church will have you." She was given a vacant lot and $5,000 and told to start her own church in Monroe, Louisiana. When she died in 1985, she held the distinction of having the longest pastorate in the Louisiana conference, and the largest Methodist church in the world pastored by a woman. The church she had started in 1952 had over 2,200 members at her death.

The Fundamental Methodist Conference, which split from the Methodist Church in 1942, does not ordain women. However, the Evangelical Methodist Church split from the Methodist Church in 1945 and does ordain women as elders.

On May 4, 1956, in Minneapolis, Minnesota, the General Conference of the Methodist Church approved full clergy rights for women. This was done by adding one sentence to the Book of Discipline: "All foregoing paragraphs, chapters and sections of Part III [of the Book of Discipline] shall apply to women as well as to men." Bishops were now required to appoint every pastor in good standing, regardless of gender. Maud Jensen was the first woman to be granted full clergy rights after this decision, in what is now the Central Pennsylvania Annual Conference. Grace Huck was another woman accepted into probationary status as part of this historic vote, and she was received into full connection in 1958. She recalls the resistance to her ministry by a male member of her church in one of her early appointments. She has been quoted as saying that when the district superintendent told the congregation he was appointing a woman minister, one man shouted, "There will be no skirts in this pulpit while I'm alive." She also noted that he later became one of her best supporters.

=== Evangelical United Brethren Church ===
The Church of the United Brethren in Christ started ordaining women with full clergy rights in 1889.

In 1946, the Church of the United Brethren in Christ united with the Evangelical Church to form the Evangelical United Brethren Church. The Evangelical Church had never ordained women. The Bishops from both churches agreed to not ordain women in the newly formed church, but there was never a vote on it at annual conference. Many churches continued to ordain women with full clergy rights.

=== Wesleyan Methodist Church (UK) ===
In 1890, women were first ordained as deaconesses in the Wesleyan Methodist Church.

=== African Methodist Episcopal Church ===
The African Methodist Episcopal Church began officially ordaining female deaconesses in 1948. It elected its first female bishop in 2000.

== Current denominational positions ==
=== Methodist Church of Great Britain ===
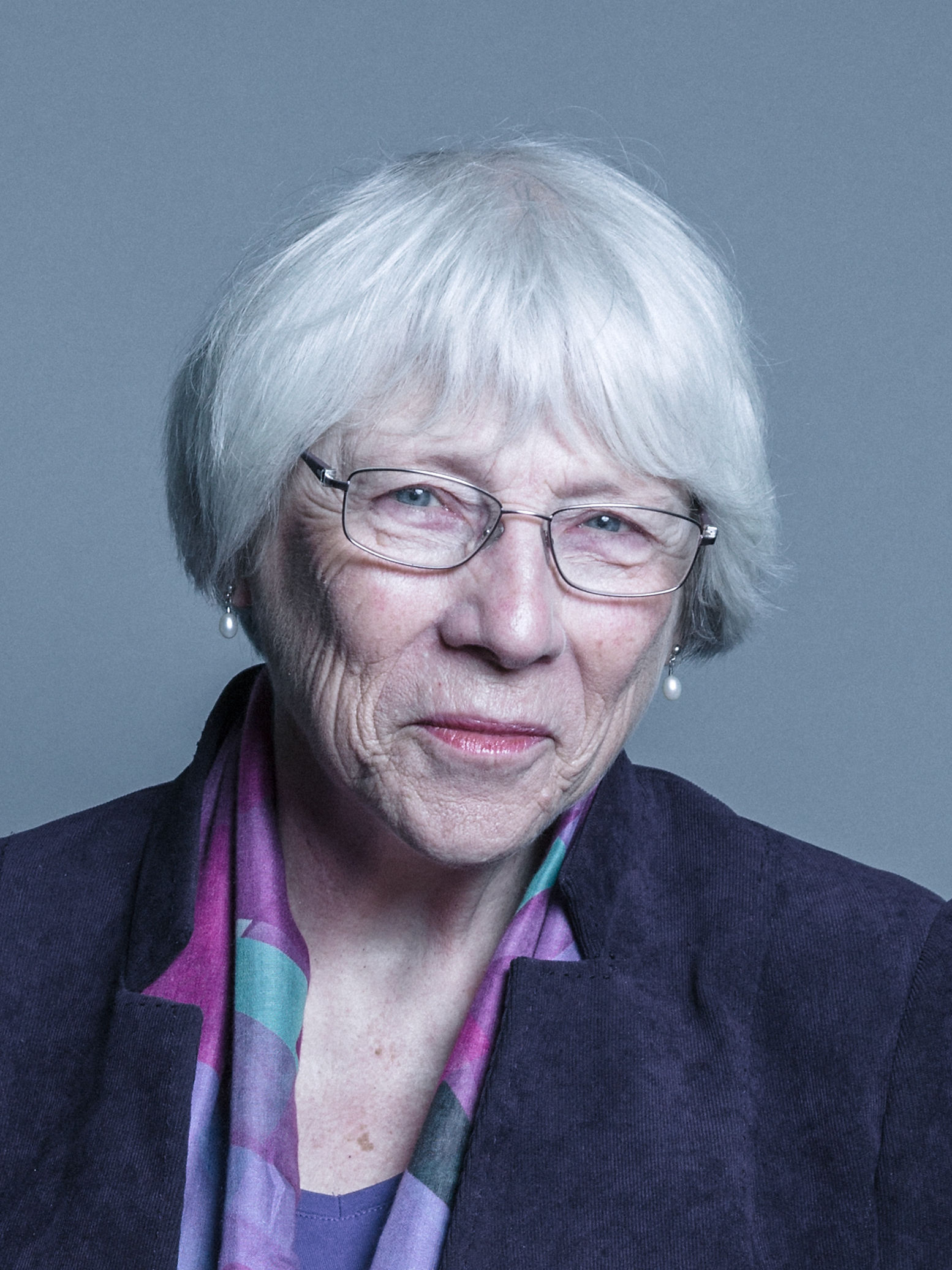
Kathleen Richardson was the first female leader of the British Methodist Conference.

On 2 July 1974, the Methodist Conference in Bristol ordained 17 women as presbyters (ministers). The number of women ministers has grown to roughly equal male ministers. In 1993, Kathleen Richardson was the first woman to be elected President of the Methodist Conference (leader of the Methodist Church in Britain).

=== Primitive Methodist Church ===
The original Primitive Methodist Church in Britain allowed female preachers and ministers until the Methodist Union in 1932.

Although the original Primitive Methodist Church in Britain allowed female preachers and ministers, the current American branch of the Primitive Methodist Church does not ordain women as elders nor does it license them as pastors or local preachers; the PMC does, however, consecrate women as deaconesses.

=== Free Methodist Church ===
In 1861, the American Free Methodist Church reported the fact that women served as preachers and in 1864, the General Conference of the Free Methodist Church created a class of lay non-pastoral ministers known as evangelists, who were both men and women. In 1911, the Free Methodist Church started ordaining women as deacons and in 1974, the FMC started ordaining women as elders.

=== United Methodist Church ===
In 1968, when the worldwide United Methodist Church was formed from the Methodist Church and the Evangelical United Brethren Church, Methodist women clergy were afforded the right of full connection.

In 1972, Jeanne Audrey Powers became the first woman to be nominated for the office of a bishop in The United Methodist Church, but she declined the appointment. In 1980, the first woman, Marjorie Matthews, was elected and consecrated as a bishop within the United Methodist Church. In 1984, the first African-American woman, Leontine T. Kelly was elected and consecrated as a bishop. In 2005, Rosemarie Wenner was the first woman to be elected bishop outside the United States. She was elected by the Germany Central Conference.

In 2016, over 12,000 women served as United Methodist clergy at all levels, from bishops to local pastors. By 2020, almost a third of full-time clergy were female.

As of 2025, 17 women are serving as bishops. A total of 33 women have been elected as UM bishops.

To try to address the lack of women of color in faculty positions at United Methodist Seminaries, the Board of Higher Education and Ministry created a scholarship program in 1989; the Angella P. Current-Felder Women of Color (WOC) Scholars program is based in Nashville and is open to women who have one non-Caucasian parent and are studying a PhD/ThD in religious studies. By 2023, the programme had 55 graduates serving with the UM.

=== Evangelical Wesleyan Church ===
The 2015 Discipline of the Evangelical Wesleyan Church stipulates: "Women may be received on trial and into full connection and be ordained deacon, on the same conditions as men, provided always that this shall not be regarded as a step toward ordination as elder."

=== Allegheny Wesleyan Methodist Connection ===
In the Allegheny Wesleyan Methodist Connection, Antoinette Brown was ordained an elder by Luther Lee in 1853, becoming the first woman to receive holy orders in that denomination (at that time called the Wesleyan Methodist Church).

=== Global Methodist Church ===
The Global Methodist Church maintains the same position as the UMC, which it split from in 2022, with no change to its view of the ordination of women as clergy.

== See also ==
- Ordination of women in Protestant denominations
