= Rochester Free Academy =

American secondary school

The Rochester Free Academy is a former secondary school and historic building (1872–1873) in Rochester, New York. It is part of the City Hall Historic District.

== History ==
The Free Academy was founded by the Board of Education in 1853 and opened in 1857. Initially called "the High School," it was incorporated as the Rochester Free Academy in 1862. In 1871, the adjacent lot was purchased, and the surviving brick structure replaced the original school building.

== Notable alumni ==
- Isaac Adler, mayor of Rochester
- Lucy Elmina Anthony, leader in the American woman's suffrage movement
- Benjamin Cunningham, New York state court judge
- Edward Joseph Hanna, prelate of the Roman Catholic Church and archbishop of San Francisco
- Adolph J. Rodenbeck, lawyer, politician, and judge from Rochester
