= Isaac Adler (politician) =

American attorney and politician (1868–1941)

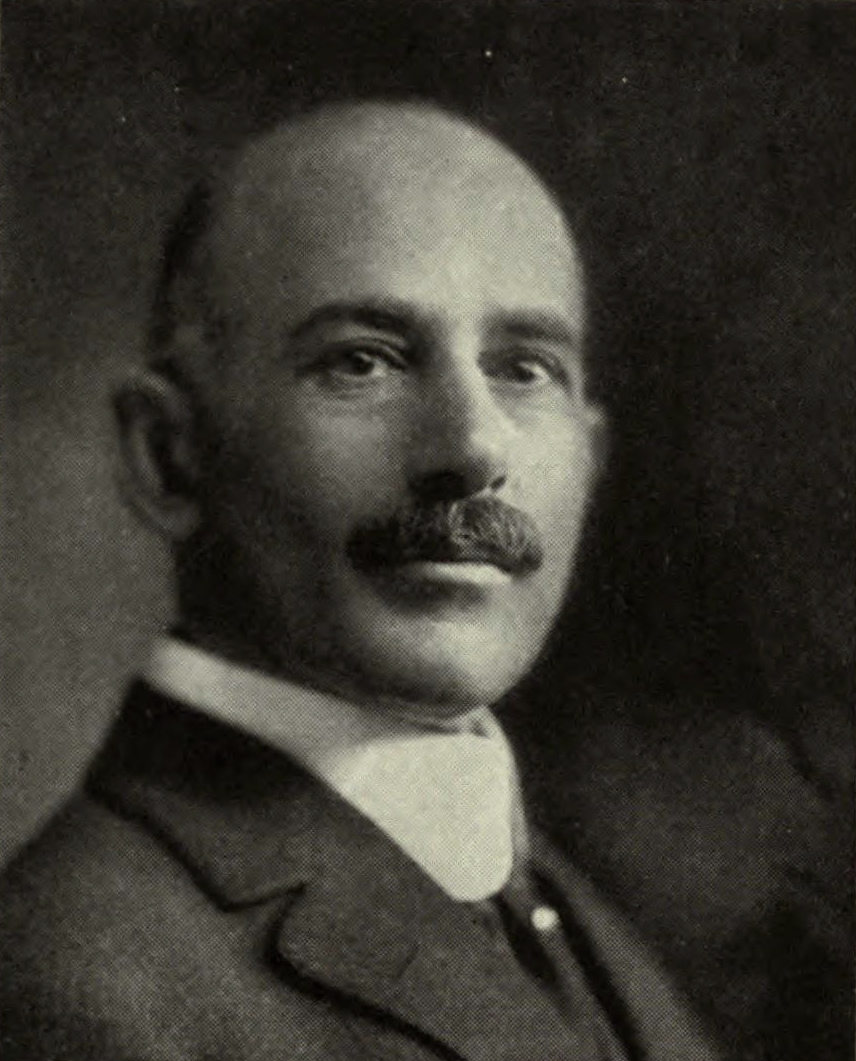

Acting Mayor of Rochester
- In office 1930–1932
- Preceded by: Joseph C. Wilson
- Succeeded by: Charles S. Owen

Personal details
- Born: May 10, 1868 Medina, New York
- Died: June 24, 1941 (aged 73) Rochester, New York
- Spouse: Cora Barnet
- Children: 4
- Parent(s): Levi Adler; Theresa Wile

Isaac Adler (May 10, 1868 – June 24, 1941) was an American attorney and politician. He was the mayor of Rochester, New York, from 1930 to 1932.

== Early life and family ==
He was born on May 10, 1868, in Medina, New York, to Levi Adler and Theresa Wile. He attended the Rochester Free Academy. He earned an A.B. at Harvard College and an LL.B. at Harvard Law School.

Together with members of his extended family, Adler owned Adler-Rochester, a clothing firm.

He married Cora Barnet and they had four children together, all girls. One died in infancy and three married and had children of their own. The last of their four children died at the age of one year.

== Career ==
Adler was of counsel to the Rochester Board of Education from 1906 to 1913, and was, at times, an attorney of counsel to the board. An advocate of the city manager form of government, he was a member of the Rochester City Council from 1927 to 1933, Vice mayor, and Mayor from 1930 to 1932. He is noted for his work preparing the city manager charter adopted by Rochester in 1925.

=== Reforming city government ===
In 1923, a group of Progressive Era Rochester civic leaders asked Adler to select members and to chair a committee with the goal of moving Rochester to a city manager system. The six men and women he invited included civic and labor leaders, individuals who held positions including chairman of the Democratic County committee and of the Women's City Club. The group carried out a study of cities that had moved to city manager systems, focusing on cities where proposals for such a change had been rejected by voters. A "City Manager League" was formed to create public support for the change. It was opposed by a "Non-Partisan League for the Preservation of Popular Government", hastily formed a few weeks before the vote. The measure passed on November 3, 1925, and the city charter was amended. Adler became vice-mayor under the new system.

== Death ==
Adler died on June 24, 1941, during a meeting at the Rochester Chamber of Commerce.

Political offices
Preceded by Joseph C. Wilson	Mayor of Rochester, NY; Acting; 1930-1932	Succeeded by Charles S. Owen
