= Adolph J. Rodenbeck =

American lawyer, politician, and judge

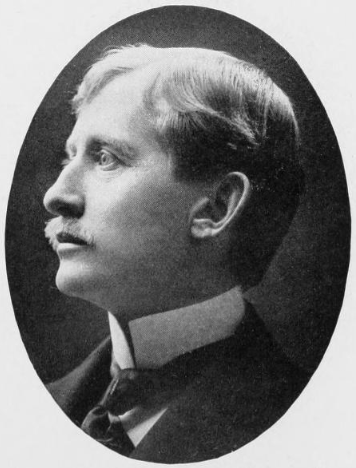

Member of the New York State Assembly
- In office 1899–1901
- Constituency: Monroe County 2nd District

Personal details
- Born: Adolph Julius Rodenbeck; October 15, 1861 Rochester, New York, US
- Died: April 8, 1960 (aged 98) Rochester, New York, US
- Resting place: Mount Hope Cemetery
- Party: Republican
- Spouse: Blanche B. Brown (m. 1927)
- Education: Rochester Free Academy; University of Rochester
- Occupation: Lawyer, politician, judge

Adolph Julius Rodenbeck (October 15, 1861 – April 8, 1960) was an American lawyer, politician, and judge from Rochester, New York.

== Life ==
Rodenbeck was born on October 15, 1861, in Rochester, New York, the son of Charles T. and Frederica C. Rodenbeck.

Rodenbeck graduated from the Rochester Free Academy in 1881 and from the University of Rochester in 1885. He was a member of Delta Kappa Epsilon at the University. He then studied law in the office of Henry G. Danforth in Rochester and finished his studies in a New York City office. He was admitted to the bar in 1887, and after an extended trip abroad he settled in Rochester and worked as a lawyer there. He was appointed Second Assistant City Attorney in 1892, First Assistant City Attorney in 1892, and Corporation Counsel in 1894. He served in the latter position until June 1898, after which he resumed his private law practice. In 1898, he was elected to the New York State Assembly as a Republican, representing the Monroe County 2nd District. He served in the Assembly in 1899, 1900, and 1901.

In 1901, Rodenbeck was elected Mayor of Rochester. He served as Mayor from 1902 to 1903. During this time, he was primarily concerned with increasing the water supply for the city's growing population with water from Lake Ontario. In November 1903, Governor Benjamin Odell appointed him Judge of the New York Court of Claims to fill a vacancy caused by the death of Judge Charles T. Saxton. In March 1904, he was reappointed Judge for a term that expired in 1909. In 1906, the Court's Judges' terms were extended ten years. The Court was abolished in 1911, but when it was recreated in 1915 he became Chairman of the Court.

Rodenbeck was a delegate-at-large to the 1915 New York State Constitutional Convention. In February 1916, Governor Charles Seymour Whitman appointed him Justice of the New York Supreme Court to succeed retiring Justice Arthur E. Sutherland. He was elected for a full term as Justice in the election that year. He served as Justice until he reached the mandatory retirement age of 70 in 1932. He was widely known in legal circles for "The Anatomy of the Law," his 1925 volume on the divisions of the law through its various branches.

Rodenbeck was a trustee of the Wagner Memorial Lutheran College, secretary of the Central Republican Club, and a member of the Freemasons, the Odd Fellows, the Down Town Republican Club, the Genesee Valley Club, the Monroe Club, the Rochester Whist Club, the Monroe County Historical Society, the New York State Bar Association, the Rochester Bar Association, Phi Beta Kappa, the Maennerchor Society, the Rochester Historical Society, the Association of Alumni of the American Academy of Dramatic Arts of New York City, and the German-American Society. In 1927, he married his former secretary Blanche B. Brown at the Church of the Transfiguration in New York City, with Rev. Rudolph Ray officiating the service.

Rodenbeck died at home on April 8, 1960. He was buried in Mount Hope Cemetery.

New York State Assembly
Preceded by James M. E. O'Grady	New York State Assembly; Monroe County, 2nd District; 1899–1901	Succeeded by George H. Smith
Political offices
Preceded by George A. Carnahan	Mayor of Rochester, New York; 1902–1903	Succeeded by James Goold Cutler
