= City Hall Historic District (Rochester, New York) =

Historic district in New York, United States

- U.S. National Register of Historic Places
- U.S. Historic district
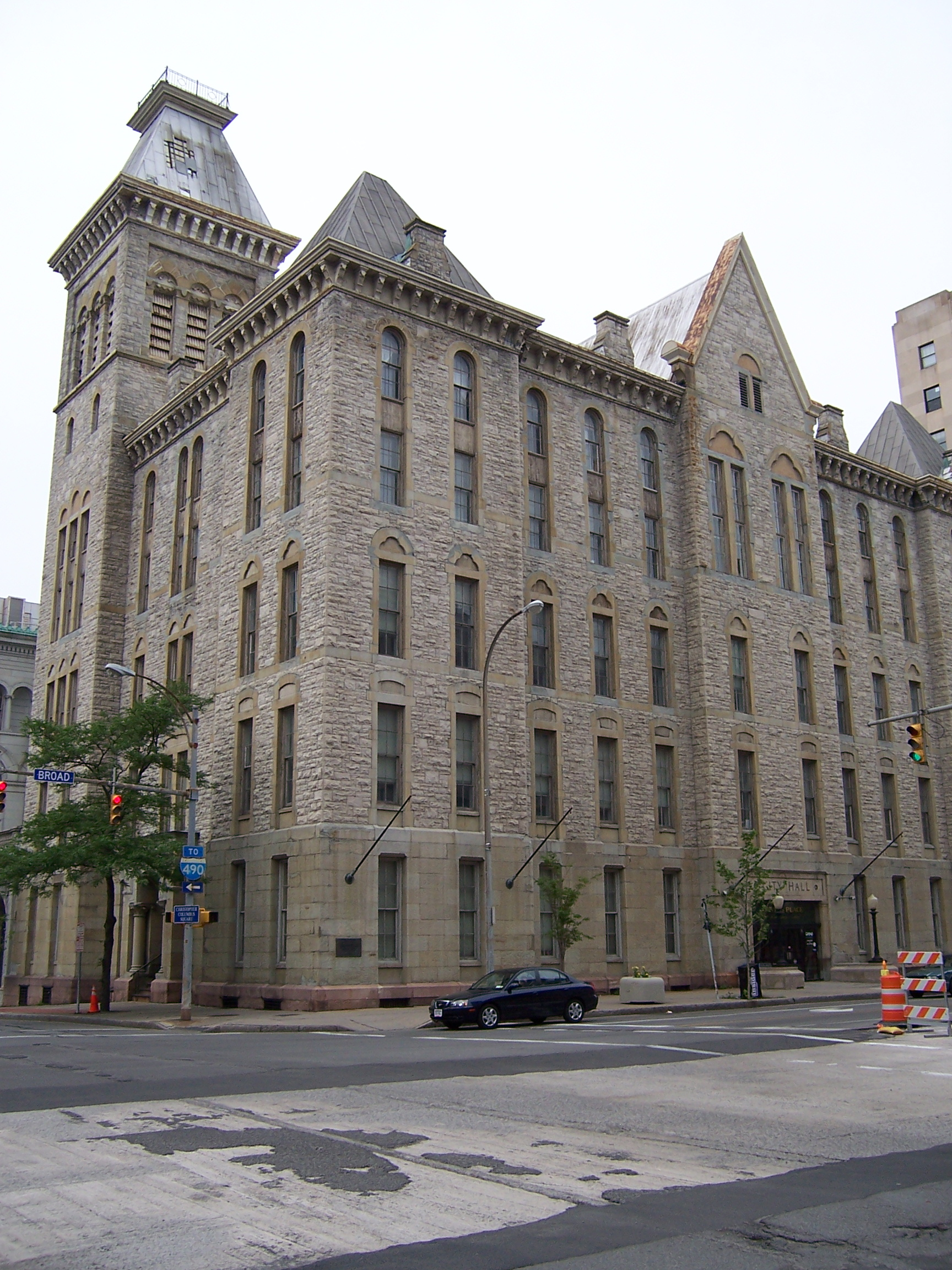
- The old Rochester City Hall in June 2010

- Location within New York Location within the United States
- Location: S. Fitzhugh St. between Broad and W. Main Sts., Rochester, New York
- Coordinates: 43°9′16″N 77°36′50″W
- Area: 3 acres (1.2 ha)
- Built: 1848
- Architect: Warner, A.J.
- Architectural style: Renaissance, Gothic Revival, Italian Renaissance
- NRHP reference No.: 74001258
- Added to NRHP: September 17, 1974

City Hall Historic District is a national historic district located at Rochester in Monroe County, New York. The district consists of four buildings arranged in a 19th-century civic complex. The buildings are the Rochester City Hall (1874–1875), Monroe County Courthouse (1894–1896), Rochester Free Academy (1872–1873), and St. Luke's Episcopal Church (1824). Andrew Jackson Warner designed the City Hall and Free Academy buildings. His son, J. Foster Warner, designed the Monroe County Courthouse.

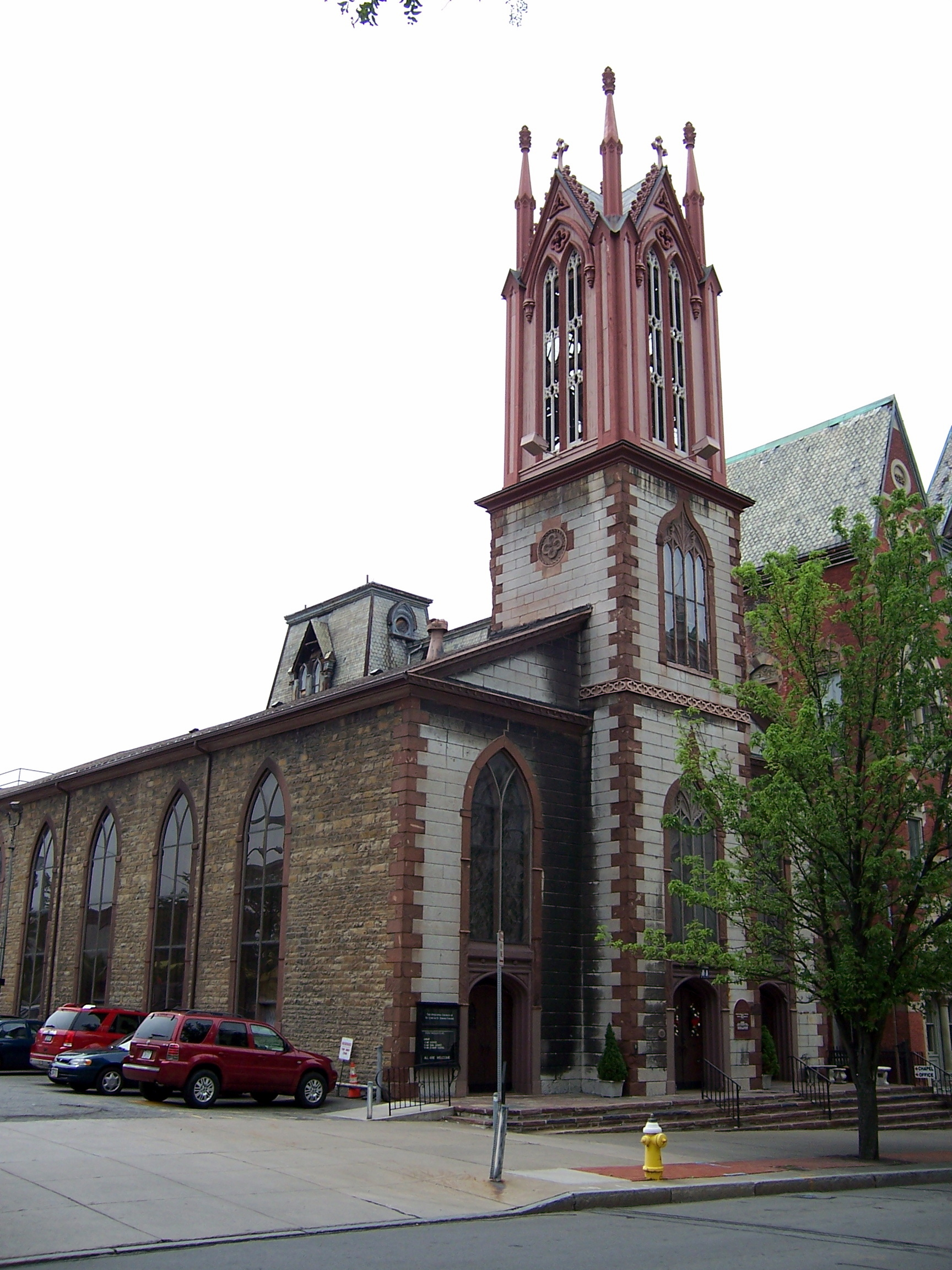
St. Luke's Episcopal Church

The National Register of Historic Places listed it in 1974.

== See also ==
- National Register of Historic Places listings in Rochester, New York
