= James Monroe Buckley =

Editor of the Christian Advocate

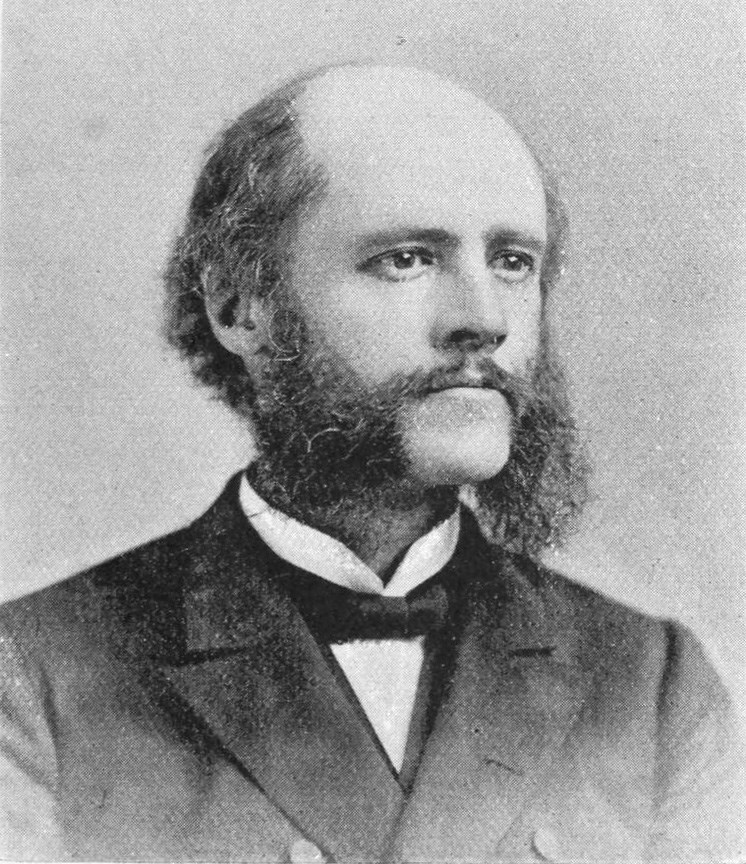
- Born: December 16, 1836; Rahway, New Jersey, US
- Died: February 10, 1920 (aged 83); Morristown, New Jersey, US
- Burial place: Pine Hill Cemetery
- Occupations: Minister; doctor; author; editor
- Spouse(s): Eliza Burns (m. 1864–1866); Sarah Staples (m. 1874–1883); Adelaide Hill (m. 1886–1910)

James Monroe Buckley (December 16, 1836 – February 10, 1920) was an American physician, author, minister of the Methodist Episcopal Church and editor of the Christian Advocate. He was a driving force behind the establishment of the first Methodist hospital in the world and a leading opponent of the ordination of women and women's suffrage in the United States.

== Early life and education ==
James Monroe Buckley was born on December 16, 1836 in Rahway, New Jersey to John and Abby L. (née Monroe) Buckley. His father was a native of England and a Methodist Episcopal minister who died soon after James was born.

He was educated at Pennington Seminary and Wesleyan University, although he withdrew during his second year for health reasons and continued with private instructors. He later received honorary degrees from Wesleyan, Emory and Henry College, and Syracuse University.

== Ministry ==
Buckley became a minister of the Methodist Episcopal Church in 1859, preaching several churches in New Hampshire (1859–63), Detroit (1863–66), and Brooklyn and Stamford, Connecticut (1866–80).

Buckley served as a delegate to the General Conferences of the Methodist Episcopal Church from 1872 to 1912. During the Conferences, Buckley took a leading role, and the General Conference was sometimes referred to as "Dr. Buckley in Session." In one Conference, he is said to have taken the floor seven hundred times.

He was also a delegate to international ecumenical conferences in London (1881), Washington (1891), and Toronto (1911), and a member of the Church's Board of Foreign Missions, serving as its president for three years.

=== Christian Advocate and other writing ===
In 1880, Buckley was elected as editor of the Christian Advocate, serving for over 30 years until his retirement from the journal in 1912. His editorials in the Christian Advocate were widely influential.

He also wrote a number of books. He was known as a formidable debater and writer and passionately argued for causes he believed in. According to one writer, he was "acclaimed the greatest debater in Methodism, if not in the nation."

=== Hospital administrator ===
From 1882 to 1917, Buckley served as a president of the Methodist Episcopal Hospital in Brooklyn, the first Methodist hospital in the world. He had advocated for the hospital through his editorial work on the accidental death of a church organist and served on its board for thirty-five years. George I. Seney read Buckley's editorials and was inspired to contribute land and assets worth over $410,000 to make the hospital possible. Buckley also served as president of the board for the New Jersey State Village for Epileptics and New Jersey Hospital for the Insane.

=== Views ===
Within the General Conference, Buckley was known as a leader of conservative Methodists. In particular, he was a vocal and influential opponent of women's rights and according to historian Jean Miller Schmidt, "one of the foremost opponents of both clergy and laity rights for women in the church." In 1888, he led the Committee on the Eligibility of Women to reject female delegates to the General He opposed Anna Oliver's efforts to preach, saying "I am opposed to inviting any woman to preach before this meeting. If the mother of our Lord were on earth, I should oppose her preaching here." Buckley also debated the topic publicly, including with Anna Howard Shaw, a leading suffragist and fellow physician who had been ordained by the Methodist Protestant Church as the first female Methodist minister. According to Schmidt, women were not allowed licenses to preach in the Methodist Episcopal Church by the General Conference until Buckley's death in 1920.

Buckley also opposed women's suffrage, writing The Wrong and Peril of Woman Suffrage.

== Personal life ==
Buckley was married three times; all three of his wives died. He married Eliza Burns in Detroit on August 2, 1864. They had no children, and she died on February 27, 1866. He remarried to Sarah Isabella (French) Staples in Detroit on April 22, 1874. She died on November 29, 1883 after giving birth to two children, Monroe (b. August 2, 1875) and Sarah Isabella (b. July 16, 1883). Buckley remarried a final time to Adelaide Hill on August 23, 1886 in Dover, New Hampshire. She died on April 23, 1910.

Buckley was a member of the New York Society for the Prevention of Vice, the Medico-Psychological Society of America, the New England Society of New York, the New Jersey Sons of the American Revolution, the General Society of Colonial Wars, and the Methodist Historical Society.

Buckley died in Morristown, New Jersey on February 10, 1920.

== Selected works ==
- Two weeks in the Yosemite Valley (1872)
- Christians and the theater (1875)
- Oats or Wild Oats (1885)
- The Land of the Czar and the Nihilist (1886)
- Faith-healing, Christian science and kindred phenomena (1892)
- Travels in three continents, Europe, Africa, Asia (1894)
- A history of Methodists in the United States (1896)
- The fundamentals and their contrasts (1906)
- The Wrong and peril of woman suffrage (1909)
- Theory and practice of foreign missions (1911)
- Constitutional and parliamentary history of the Methodist Episcopal church (1912)
