= Walter Ashbel Sellew =

Methodist bishop

The Right Reverend Walter Ashbel Sellew
- Bishop
- Church: Free Methodist Church
- In office: 1898–1929
- Previous post: Presiding Elder

Orders
- Ordination: 1872
- Consecration: 1898

Personal details
- Born: February 27, 1844 Gowanda, New York, US
- Died: January 16, 1929 (aged 84) Jamestown
- Denomination: Methodist
- Parents: Ashbel R. Sellew, Jane M. Sellew née Tucker
- Education: Dartmouth College

Walter Ashbel Sellew (born 27 February 1844—16 January 1929) was a Methodist bishop, holding that office in the Free Methodist Church. Sellew was a prominent figure in the Wesleyan–Holiness movement, writing on the topics of the importance of a woman's headcovering, the ordination of women in Methodism, and missions.

== Early life and career ==
Walter Ashbel Sellew was born in Gowanda, New York on 27 February 1844 to Ashbel R. Sellew and Jane M. Sellew née Tucker. In 1866, Sellew graduated from Dartmouth College with a Bachelor of Arts and in 1869, he earned a Master of Arts from the same institution; he was a member of Zeta chapter of Psi Upsilon. With respect to academics, he "maintained a high rank in scholarship" and was elected a Phi Beta Kappa.

In 1872, Sellew was ordained in the Free Methodist Church. He held pastorates successively at Tonawanda, Rochester, Spring Arbor, Dunkirk, Gerry, Allegany, and Buffalo.

Between 1887 and 1898, Walter Ashbel Sellew was the presiding elder of the Chautauqua, Allegany, Buffalo, Oil City, Bradford and Pittsburgh districts of the Free Methodist Church. He was consecrated a bishop of the Free Methodist Church on 15 October 1898.

Sellew served as a missionary for the Free Methodist Church in 1906, and was known for his service in China and Japan.

== Academia and philanthropy ==
Sellew served as the president of the A. M. Chesebrough Seminary in North Chili, New York.

Sellew served as the treasurer for the Gerry Home for Aged Persons and the Gerry Orphanage.

== Writings ==
Sellew published Clara Leffingwell, a Missionary, among other Christian religious publications.

He championed the ordination of women in Methodism. In 1894, Sellew published Why Not?: A Plea for the Ordination of Those Women Whom God Has Called to Preach the Gospel. Sellew was the primary architect of the resolution in the Free Methodist Church that led to the ordination of women as deacons in 1911, which read: "Whenever any annual conference, shall be satisfied that any woman is called of God to preach the gospel, that annual conference may be permitted to receive her on trial, and into full connection, and ordain her as a deacon, all on the same conditions as we receive men into the same relations."

Sellew wrote on the ordinance of headcovering among Christian women in an article titled "Woman in the Public Service"; in this, he stated:

The claim which God's word has upon us is infinitely stronger than the convenience or inconvenience of the individual, and to consider it in that light is to bring it into our contempt. The only safe way in this particular, as in all others, is to do just what the word commands. If in this particular respect the hats usually worn by our pilgrim sisters are too heavy, a small, light bonnet might be worn. If such would be lighter and easier in many cases they certainly would be a great improvement as far as appearances are concerned over the ungainly hats frequently worn. At least something can be devised that may be worn so that the word may be obeyed. Let something be worn on the head so that, while our sisters shall maintain that equality in the spirit and in their public ministrations that is given them by God's word, they may at the same time acknowledge that measure of subjection to man which nature and the word of God so plainly teach.
