= Benjamin Cunningham =

American judge (1874–1946)

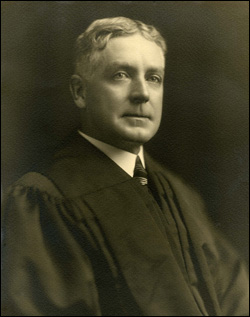
- Cunningham in the early 1900s
- Born: Benjamin B. Cunningham; 1874; Rochester, New York, U.S.
- Died: 1946 (aged 71–72)
- Education: Rochester Free Academy
- Occupations: Judge, city attorney
- Years active: 1892—1946

Benjamin B. Cunningham (April 1, 1874– January 2, 1946), was a long-serving New York state court judge who "in a 47-year public career initiated, fought for or passed upon legal questions of lasting importance to official Rochester".

Born in Rochester, New York, Cunningham graduated from the Rochester Free Academy in 1892, studied law in the office of William Butler Crittenden, and gained admission to the bar in 1895.

From 1898 to 1916 he was employed by the Corporation Counsel of Rochester, holding the posts of Managing Clerk, Assistant City Attorney, and City attorney in succession. He was elected Corporation Counsel in 1915, holding office from 1916 to the close of 1919, during which period he put in a year as President of the Rochester Bar Association. In his capacity as Corporation Counsel, he was the draftsman of a new City Charter, engaged in lengthy litigation to protect the city's water supply in Hemlock, and had repeated confrontations in court with local monopolies and the State Public Service Commission over fares and practices.

Cunningham was twice elected to the Supreme Court for the Seventh District, sitting from 1920 to his mandatory retirement at the close of 1944. At the time of his election in November 1919, it was noted that he was "known throughout the state for his successful prosecution of the Rochester fare case". Shortly after he assumed office on the court on January 1, 1920, he fell ill, and was deemed unlikely to survive, but he spent four months in a homeopathic hospital, and then went resort in the South to recover, and was well enough to return to work in the fall of that year. He stood as a Republican candidate for the State Court of Appeals in 1940, a failing enterprise due to the continued popularity of Franklin D. Roosevelt and the Democratic Party in that year. He functioned as a trial judge for seventeen years before being appointed to the Appellate Division for the Fourth Department in 1937. He was elevated to Presiding Justice in 1944, a post he held for the entirety of that year.

He acted as an Official Referee from his retirement to his death on January 2, 1946. Cunningham died at his home in Rochester following a lengthy illness and decline, at the age of 71. He was interred at Holy Sepulcher Cemetery.
