= Anna Oliver =

American preacher and activist (1840–1892)

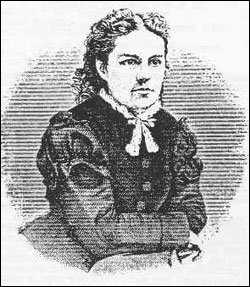
- Born: Vivianna Olivia Snowden; April 12, 1840; New Brunswick, New Jersey, U.S.
- Died: November 21, 1892 (aged 52); Greensboro, Maryland, U.S.
- Known for: Applying for ordination in the Methodist Episcopal Church

Vivianna Olivia Snowden (April 12, 1840 – November 21, 1892), better known by her professional name Anna Oliver, was an American preacher and activist who was a member of the Methodist Episcopal Church and was one of the first women to attempt full ordination in the church.

== Biography ==
Oliver was born Vivianna Olivia Snowden near New Brunswick, New Jersey on April 12, 1840. She would later take the name Anna Oliver as to not embarrass her family by trying to be ordained as a minister. She was well educated in Brooklyn, New York where her family had moved, and received an MA with honors from Rutgers Female College. She went to Georgia with the American Missionary Association to teach black children, but left after a year to protest the pay gap between male and female teachers there. She then moved to Ohio in 1870 where she studied at McMicken School of Design, but became involved in the temperance movement and felt called to join the ministry.

In 1876, Oliver became the first woman to graduate from a Methodist seminary, receiving a Bachelor of Divinity from Boston University School of Theology. With a local preacher's license she was able to enter the ministry as a preacher, the first step towards full ordination.

In 1876, she assumed interim pastoral duties of a struggling church in Passaic, New Jersey, where she increased membership by 500 percent. She was assisted in her duties by Amanda Smith, a black evangelist; despite their success however, they were replaced by a regular male preacher the following year. Oliver was then invited to preach in New York, but encountered resistance there as well, James Monroe Buckley, an influential minister, in his opposition to Oliver, was quoted as saying "I am opposed to inviting any woman to preach before this meeting. If the mother of our Lord were on earth, I should oppose her preaching here." However, another struggling church, this time in Brooklyn, invited Oliver to become its pastor, and she helped it grow from a congregation of thirteen to more than a hundred by the end of the year, with a Sunday school of two hundred.

In 1880, Oliver applied for ordination to the Methodist Episcopal Church along with Anna Howard Shaw. Both of women had graduated from Boston University School of Theology, obtained local preacher's licenses, and been approved by the ordination examining committees; however, bishop Edward G. Andrews had refused ordination to either of them.

The Jamaica Plain Quarterly Conference enthusiastically supported Oliver, and after Oliver was given a chance to speak at the New England Conference they voted to support her at the General Conference as well, with the presiding elder Lorenzo R. Thayer saying he would appeal Andrews' decision; however Andrews refused to back down and told the women they could simply leave the church if the wanted to persist in their goal of ordination. Shaw joined the Methodist Protestant Church and was ordained there, but Oliver stayed in the Methodist Episcopal Church trying to get it to change its rules. At the 1880 General Conference, Oliver arrived with pamphlets for the delegates and her supporters ready to appeal Andrews' ruling, however their petitions were rejected and the Conference would not change its rules on the ordination of women until 1920.

Afterwards she returned to her church in Brooklyn, which advertised her as "Rev. Miss Anna Oliver, Pastor", where she regularly shared the pulpit with other women, including Shaw and Katherine A. Lent, another graduate from Boston University School of Theology, as well as suffrage and temperance workers. She continued to encounter resistance from some in the church, especially Buckley, editor of the influential Christian Advocate, who according to Shaw "declared that he would destroy her influence in the church." Oliver died while visiting her brother and sister in Greensboro, Maryland in 1892, "broken in health and spirit, believing she had failed in her attempts to gain equal suffrage for women," according to Paige Hoydick. However, her niece, Lillian Snowden, would take up the cause of women's rights and become a leading suffragette in Stratford, Connecticut, and despite never receiving full ordination, Oliver has been seen as inspiring other women, especially those working in the cause of women's rights.

== See also ==
- Ordination of women
- Ordination of women in Methodism
- Timeline of women in religion in the United States
