= Anna Howard Shaw =

19th- and 20th-century American women's suffrage leader

- Shaw in 1915
- Born: February 14, 1847; Newcastle-upon-Tyne, England
- Died: July 2, 1919 (aged 72); Moylan, Pennsylvania, U.S.
- Education: Albion College, 1875; Boston University School of Theology, 1880; Boston University School of Medicine, 1886
- Occupations: Women's suffrage and temperance movement activist; minister; physician

Anna Howard Shaw (February 14, 1847 – July 2, 1919) was a leader of the women's suffrage movement in the United States. She was also a physician and one of the first women to be ordained as a Methodist minister in the United States.

== Early life ==
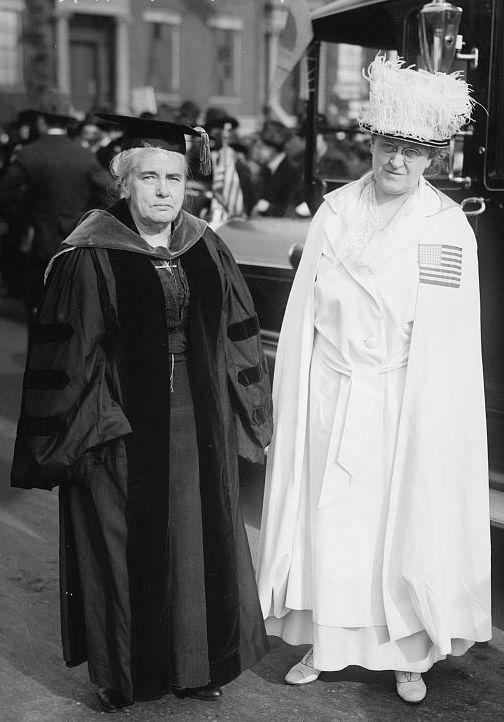
Carrie Chapman Catt and Anna Howard Shaw in 1917

Shaw was born in Newcastle-upon-Tyne in 1847. When she was four, she and her family emigrated to the United States and settled in Lawrence, Massachusetts. When Shaw was twelve years old, her father took "up claim of three hundred and sixty acres of land in the wilderness" of northern Michigan "and sent [her] mother and five young children to live there alone." Her mother had envisioned their Reed City, Michigan home to be "an English farm" with "deep meadows, sunny skies and daisies," but was devastated upon their arrival to discover that it was a "forlorn and desolate" log cabin "in what was then a wilderness, 40 miles from a post office and 100 miles from a railroad." Here, the family faced the dangers of living on the frontier. Shaw became very active during this period, helping her siblings refurbish their home and supporting her mother in her time of shock and despair. Shaw took on several physical tasks such as "digging of a well, chopp[ing] wood for the big fireplace, [and] fell[ing] trees."

Seeing her mother's emotional suffering, Shaw blamed her irresponsible father for "ha[ving] g[iven] no thought to the manner in which [their family was] to make the struggle and survive the hardships before [them]." While her invalid mother was overburdened with household chores", her father in Lawrence could freely dedicate "much time to the Abolition cause and big public movements of his day."

The family's misfortunes grew worse over the years. During the Civil War, her sister Eleanor died giving birth, and her brother Tom was wounded. When Shaw was fifteen, she became a school teacher at the Crapo School in Reed City. After her older brothers and father joined the war effort, she used her earnings to help support her family. Yet with "every month of effort, the gulf between income and expenses grew wider."

== Call to preach ==
Shaw felt a call to preach from an early age. As a child, she would spend time in the woods near her house and stand on tree stumps to preach to the forest. She was determined to go to college and follow the path that she felt was God's will for her life. Despite her family's disapproval, Shaw's drive to attend college became firmer as she matured. After the Civil War, she abandoned her teaching job and moved in with her married sister Mary in Big Rapids, Michigan. While she recalls that she would have preferred more physical and active labor, such as digging ditches or shoveling coal, she was forced to pick up the "dreaded needle" and become a dressmaker, one of the more acceptable occupations available for women at the time.

A pivotal moment in Shaw's life came when she met Reverend Marianna Thompson, a Universalist minister who came to preach in Grand Rapids. Shaw went to the service, eager to see a woman in the pulpit. After the service, Shaw confided in Thompson her desire to pursue the ministry as a vocation, and Thompson strongly encouraged her to obtain an education without delay.

Thanks to Thompson's help, Shaw entered Big Rapids High School, where the preceptress, Lucy Foot, recognized Shaw's talents and drive. At the age of twenty-four, Shaw was invited by H. C. Peck, a man looking to ordain a woman into ministry in the Methodist Episcopal Church, to give her first sermon. Shaw hesitated initially because her only previous experience had been "as a little girl preaching alone in the forest...to a congregation of listening trees." With encouragement from Lucy Foot, Peck, and her close friend, Clara Osborn, Shaw agreed and gave her first sermon in Ashton, Michigan.

Despite the success of her first sermon, her newfound passion for preaching received disapproval from her classmates, friends, and family, who agreed to pay for her college education only if she abandoned preaching. Despite such continual opposition and isolation from so many, Anna continued preaching. She was "deeply moved" by Mary A. Livermore, a prominent lecturer who came to Big Rapids. Ms. Livermore gave her the following advice: "if you want to preach, go on and preach…No matter what people say, don't let them stop you!"

In 1873, the Methodist Church "voted unanimously to grant her a local preacher's license."

== Struggles during college years ==
In 1873, Shaw entered Albion College, a Methodist school in Albion, Michigan. Since her family frowned upon her career path, they refused financial support. At that point, Shaw had been a licensed preacher for three years and earned her wages by lecturing on temperance.

After Albion College, Shaw attended Boston University School of Theology in 1876. She was the only woman in her class of forty-two men, and she always felt "the abysmal conviction that [she] was not really wanted there." This attitude was furthered by her difficulty supporting herself financially. Already running on a tight income, Shaw found it unfair that the "male licensed preachers were given free accommodations in the dormitory, and their board cost each of them $1.25 while it cost her $2 to pay rent of a room outside." Additionally, she had trouble finding employment. Unlike in Albion, where she was "practically the only licensed preacher available", at Boston University, there were many preachers who she had to compete with. As she lost money to pay the rent, she struggled to feed herself and felt "cold, hunger, and lonel[y]." Shaw started questioning whether the ministerial profession was meant for her. In the face of these hardships, Shaw continued. In 1880, after she and Anna Oliver were refused ordination by the Methodist Episcopal Church, despite passing with the top exam score that year. After being rejected from the Methodist Episcopal Church, she switched churches and achieved ordination in the Methodist Protestant Church.

Following her ordination, Shaw received an MD from Boston University in 1886. During her time in medical school, she became an outspoken advocate of political rights for women.

== Role in the women's suffrage movement ==
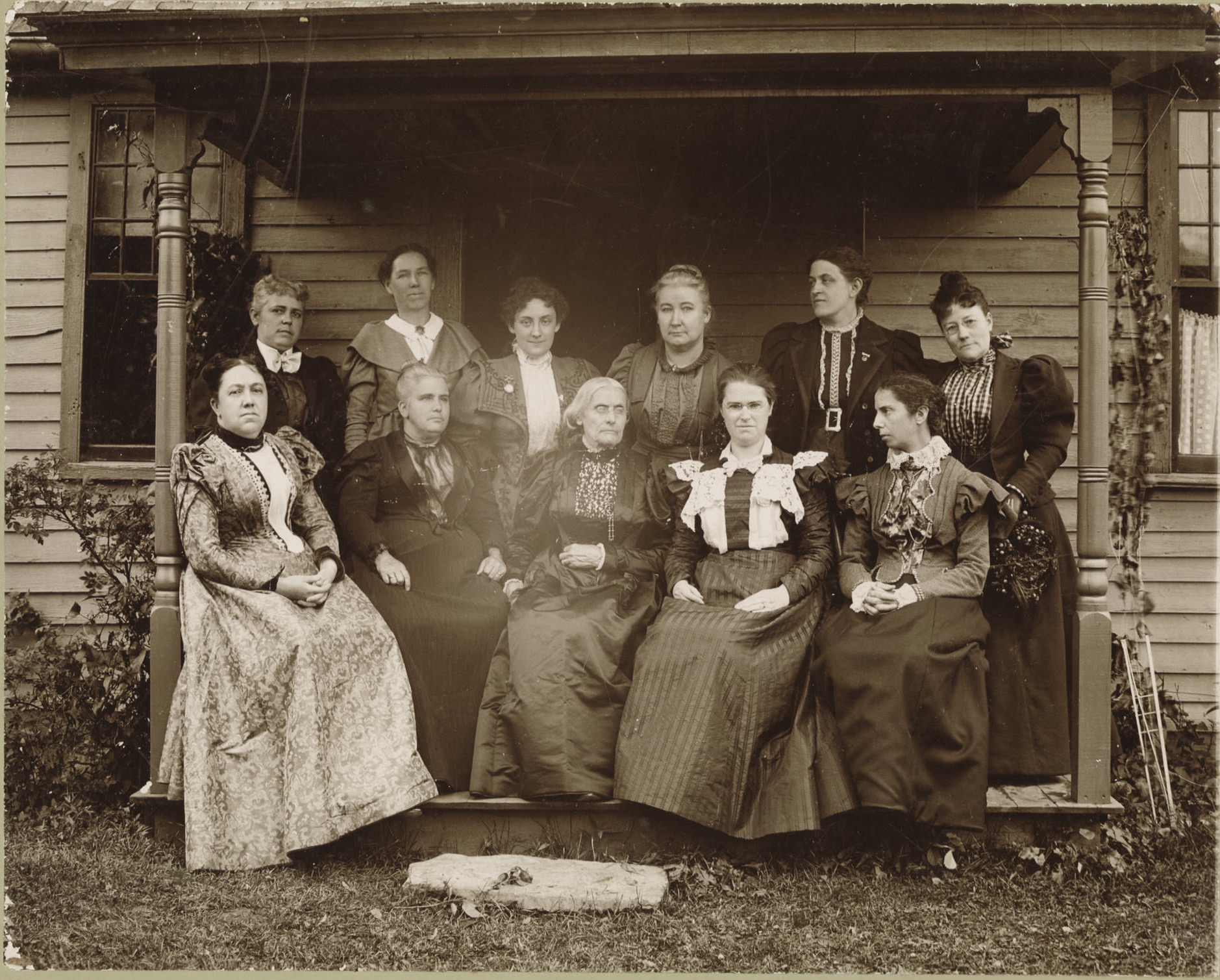
1896 photograph of Susan B. Anthony (center) and other women's rights leaders. Shaw sits to Anthony's immediate right.

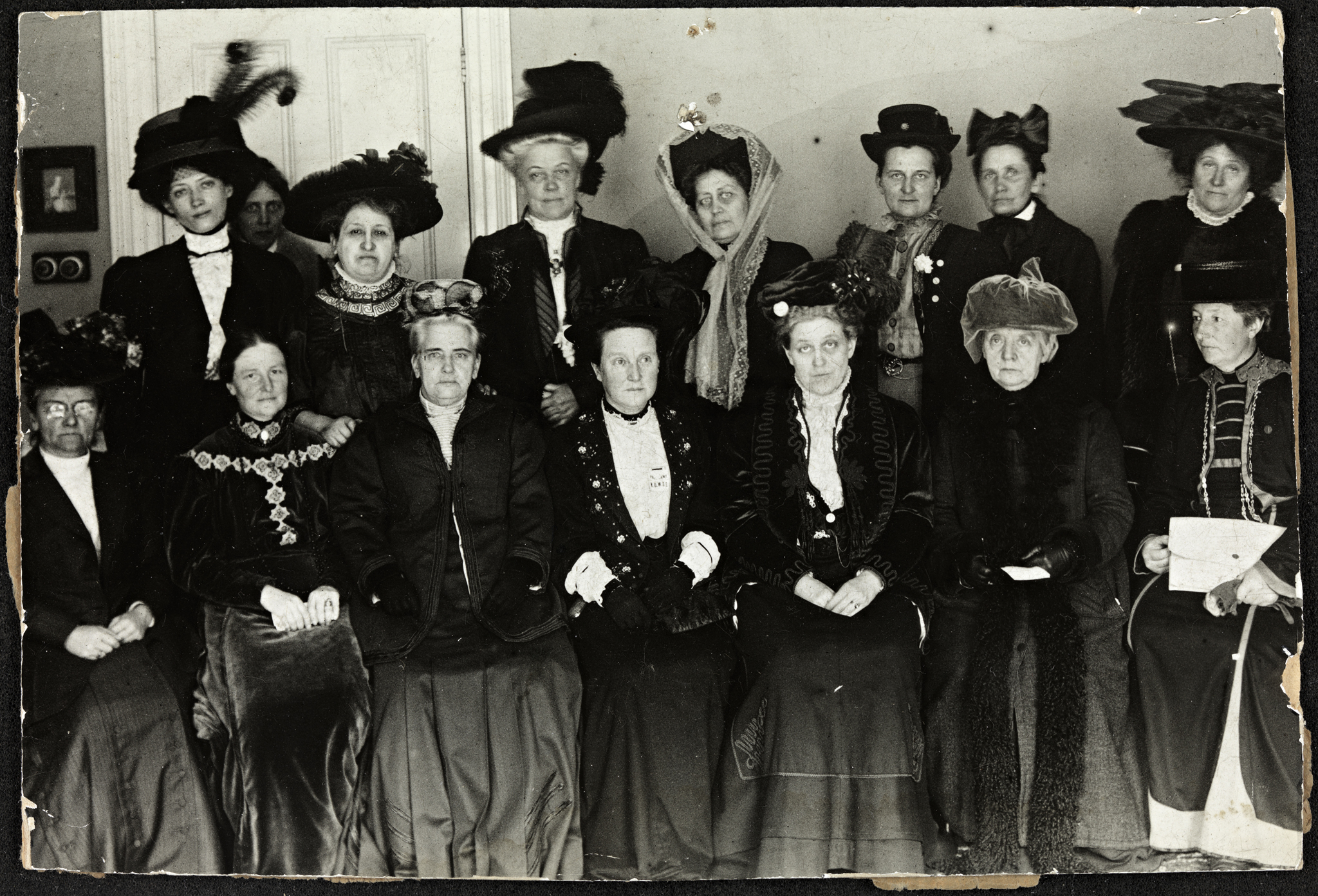
Suffrage Alliance Congress with Millicent Fawcett presiding, London 1909. Top row from left: Thora Daugaard (Denmark), Louise Qvam (Norway), Aletta Jacobs (Netherlands), Annie Furuhjelm (Finland), Madame Mirowitch (Russia), Käthe Schirmacher (Germany), Madame Honneger, unidentified. Bottom left: Unidentified, Anna Bugge (Sweden), Anna Howard Shaw (USA), Millicent Fawcett (Presiding, England), Carrie Chapman Catt (USA), F. M. Qvam (Norway), Anita Augspurg (Germany).

=== Joint effort with Susan B. Anthony ===
Beginning in 1886, Shaw served as the chair of the Franchise Department of Women's Christian Temperance Union (WCTU). Her task was "to work for woman suffrage and then to use the ballot to gain 'home protection' and temperance legislation." However, her focus on temperance subsided as she became more heavily involved in the suffrage movement by lecturing for the Massachusetts Suffrage Association and later the American Woman Suffrage Association (AWSA).

Shaw first met Susan B. Anthony in 1887. In 1888, Shaw attended the first meeting of the International Council of Women. Susan B. Anthony encouraged her to join the National Woman Suffrage Association (NWSA). Having agreed, Shaw played a key role when the two suffrage associations merged when she "helped to persuade the AWSA to merge with Anthony's and Elizabeth Cady Stanton's NWSA, creating for the first time in two decades a semblance of organizational unity within the [suffrage] movement." Beginning in 1904 and for the next eleven years, Shaw was the president of NAWSA. Under her leadership, NAWSA continued to "lobby for a national constitutional amendment granting women the right to vote."

=== Resignation from NAWSA presidency ===
During the early 20th century, Alice Paul and Lucy Burns, NAWSA members, began employing militant techniques (e.g., picketing the White House during World War I) to fight for women's suffrage. They, like other members, were inspired by the success of the militant suffragettes in England. As president of NAWSA, Shaw was pressured to support these tactics. Nevertheless, Shaw maintained that she was "unalterably opposed to militancy, believing nothing of permanent value has ever been secured by it that could not have been more easily obtained by peaceful methods." She remained aligned with Anthony's philosophy against militant tactics. In 1915, she resigned as NAWSA president and was replaced by her ally Carrie Chapman Catt.

== Later years and death ==
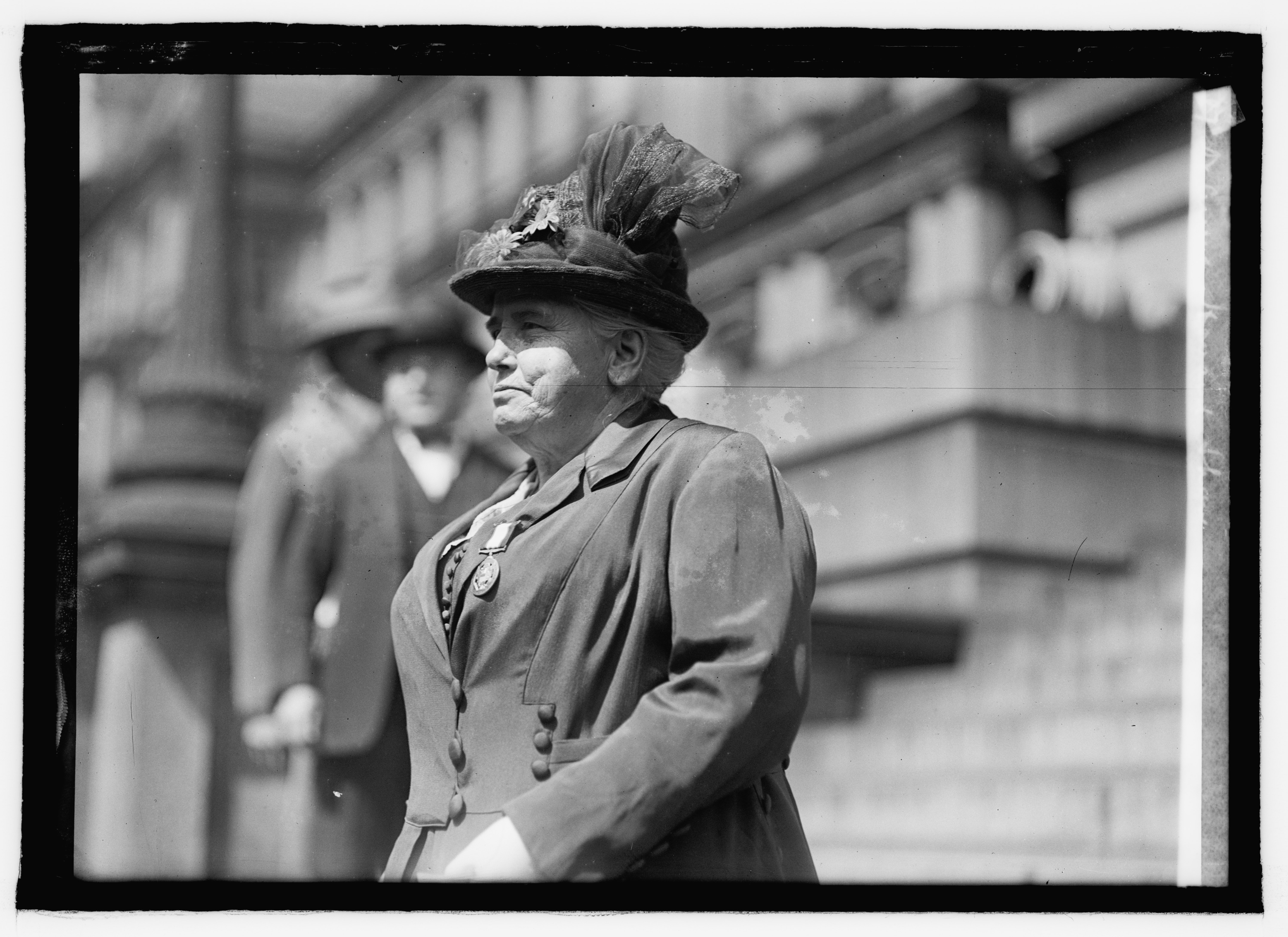
Shaw after receiving the Distinguished Service Medal (May 19, 1919)

During World War I, Shaw was head of the Women's Committee of the United States Council of National Defense, for which she became the first woman to earn the Distinguished Service Medal. She continued to lecture for the suffrage cause for the remaining years of her life.

Only months before her death, at an appearance at Baylor University in Waco, Texas, Shaw said, "The only way to refute" the argument that America was a democracy--and therefore women were entitled to vote--was "to prove that women are not people." She ended the speech by urging the women in attendance to participate in the women's suffrage movement.

She was a speaker at the 1919 National Conference on Lynching, presenting women's suffrage as a step against lynching.

Shaw died of pneumonia at her home in Moylan, Pennsylvania at the age of 72, only a few months before Congress ratified the Nineteenth Amendment to the US Constitution.

== Personal life ==
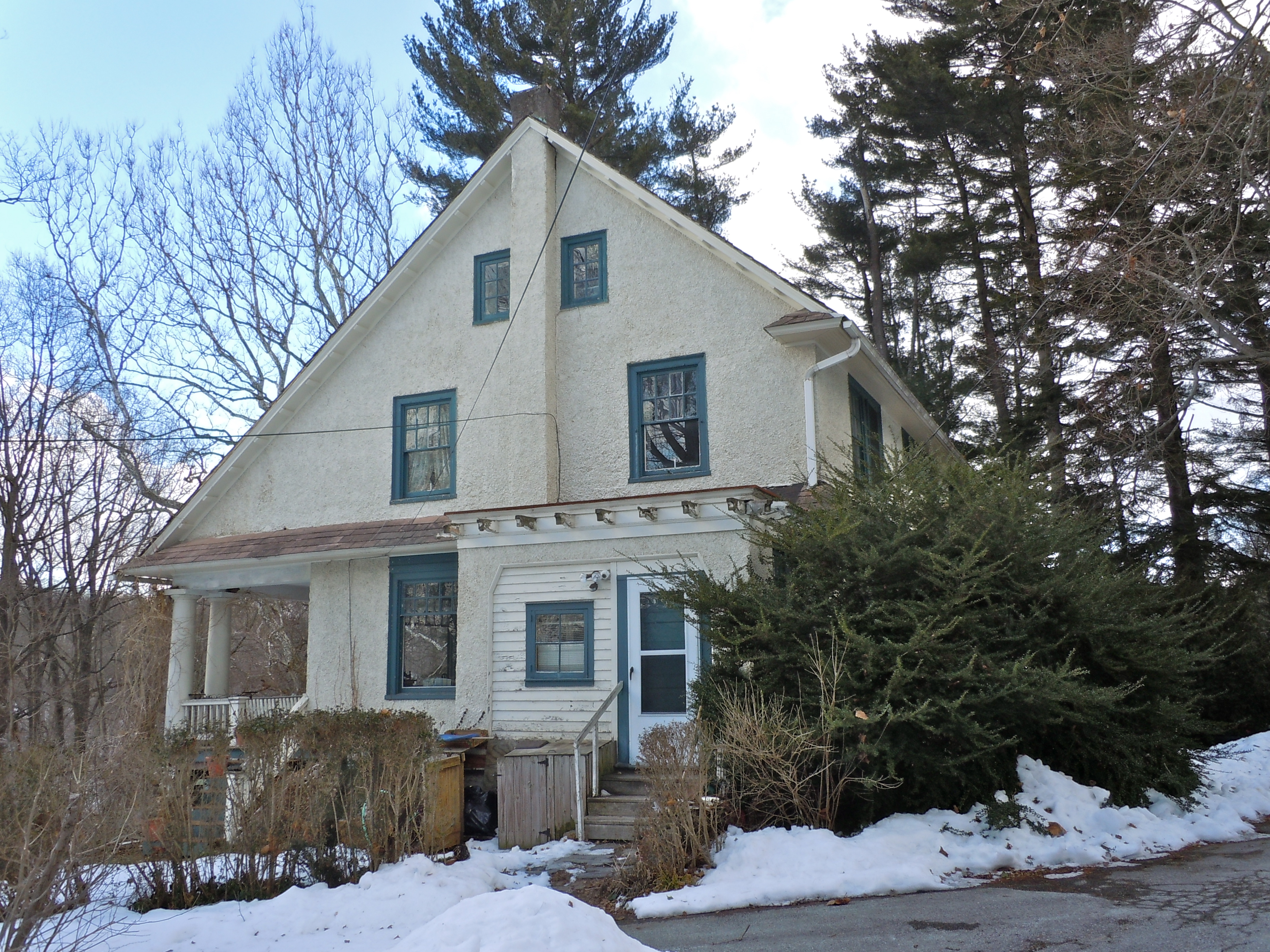
Home where Shaw lived with her companion, Lucy Anthony, the niece of Susan B. Anthony.

Shaw built a home at 240 Ridley Creek Rd., Media, during her tenure as president of the National American Woman Suffrage Assn. (1904–1915) and lived there with her companion Lucy Elmina Anthony (1859–1944), niece of Susan B. Anthony, until her death. Lucy and Anna were together for thirty years, and she was by her bedside when she died. Sarah Gertrude Banks was also close friends with Shaw.

== Legacy ==
The suffragist anthem "Votes for Women: Suffrage Rallying Song" (1915) by married couple Edward M. and Marie Zimmerman was dedicated to Shaw.

In 2000, she was inducted into the National Women's Hall of Fame. Twenty years later, in 2020, she was named an honoree of the National Women's History Alliance.

The Anna Howard Shaw Women's Center at Albion College.

The Anna Howard Shaw Center at Boston University School of Theology. Ten years after its founding in 1978, the Shaw Center was designated the women's center for the Northeastern Jurisdiction of the United Methodist Church."

The Anna Howard Shaw Junior High School, built in 1922–1924 in Southwest Schuylkill, Philadelphia, is named for her.

A statue of Anna Howard Shaw was erected next to the Community Library in Big Rapids, Michigan, in 1988.

== See also ==
- "Anna Howard Shaw Day", an episode of 30 Rock
- Eastern Victory, a car owned by Shaw
- Iron Jawed Angels, a television film where Shaw is portrayed by Lois Smith
- List of American suffragists
- List of women's rights activists
- Timeline of Women's Ordination in the US
- Timeline of women's suffrage
- Ordination of women
- Ordination of women in Methodism
