= Saxon Motor Car Company =

1910s–1920s automobile manufacturer

Saxon Motor Car Company Saxon Motor Car Corp.
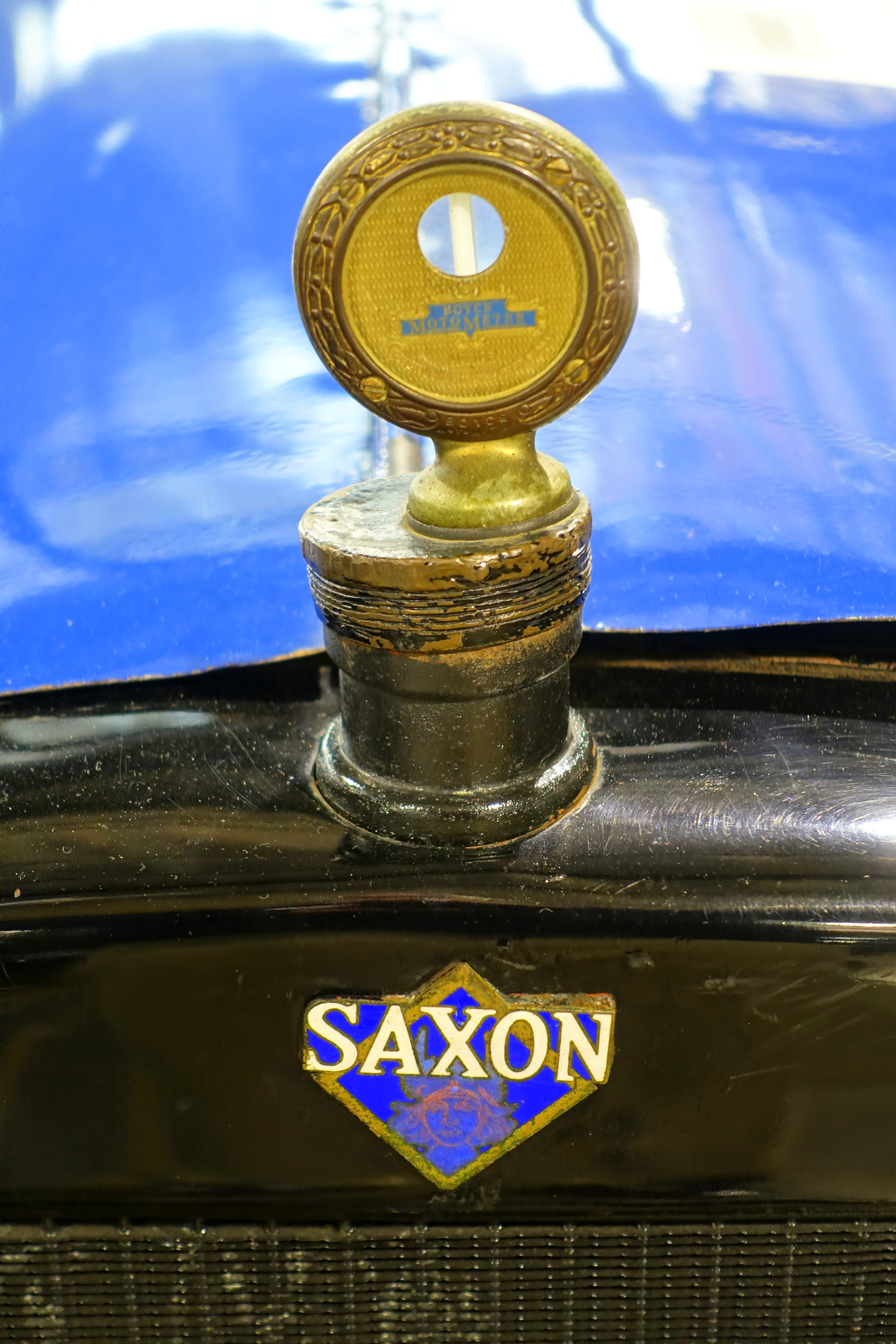
- 1914 Saxon emblem
- Founded: 1913; 113 years ago
- Founder: Hugh Chalmers
- Defunct: 1922; 104 years ago
- Fate: Bankruptcy
- Headquarters: Detroit, Michigan later Ypsilanti, Michigan, United States
- Key people: Hugh Chalmers, Harry W. Ford, Benjamin Gotfredson, C. A. Pfeffer
- Products: Automobiles
- Production output: 92,684 (1913–1922)
- Brands: Saxon, Saxon Duplex

The Saxon Motor Car Company was located in Detroit, Michigan, from 1914 to 1922. In 1917, 28,000 cars were made, making it the seventh largest car maker in the United States.

== History ==
Hugh Chalmers of Chalmers Motor Car Company began the company to market a low priced volume car. The first Saxon was a 2-seat runabout with 2-speed transmission and a four-cylinder engine made by Ferro and built in the old Demotcar factory. 7,000 were made in the first year of production. The cost of a Saxon in 1913 was $395, equivalent to $12,867 in 2025.

From 1913 to 1914, electric lighting was an extra option, which became a standard fitting to the car in 1915. Also available in 1915 was the Saxon Six, a five-passenger tourer, with a 30–35 hp (22–26 kW) Continental six-cylinder, electric starter and headlights, on a 112 in (2845 mm) wheelbase and 32×3½-inch (81×8.9 cm) wheels, all for $785, equivalent to $24,983 in 2025.

In 1914 a Saxon roadster was driven 135 miles a day for 30 days, for a total of 4,050 miles with an average of 30 mpg. It was among the first cars to christen the new Lincoln Highway. Sales skyrocketed. In 1915, Harry W. Ford, formerly with Chalmers, bought out Hugh Chalmers interest and became President of a reorganized Saxon Motor Car Corporation. Early in 1915, Saxon moved production to the former Abbott factory.

In its peak year of 1916, 27,800 Saxons were produced. The Saxon Six was followed in 1917 by a Sedan. In December 1917, Harry W. Ford was out and the new president was Benjamin Gotfredson. From 1918 the company got into financial difficulties while expanding, with large quantities of parts and building a larger factory. The 4-cylinder models were dropped from the range and the Sedan went as well in 1919.

In 1919 C. A. Pfeffer, another former Chalmers manager, became president of Saxon Motor Car Corporation. The new factory Saxon couldn't pay for was sold to General Motors. In 1920 a new model, the Saxon Duplex, powered by an overhead-valve, four-cylinder engine joined the six-cylinder model and a sedan body rejoined the range. The six-cylinder cars were no longer listed after 1921 and production had fallen to 2,100 cars.

In 1921, Saxon sold off their parts business to settle debts and used the proceeds to move the company to Ypsilanti, Michigan, where the cars were made in the Ace car plant, but this could not save the company and the last cars, probably made in 1922, were sold in 1923.

== Gallery ==
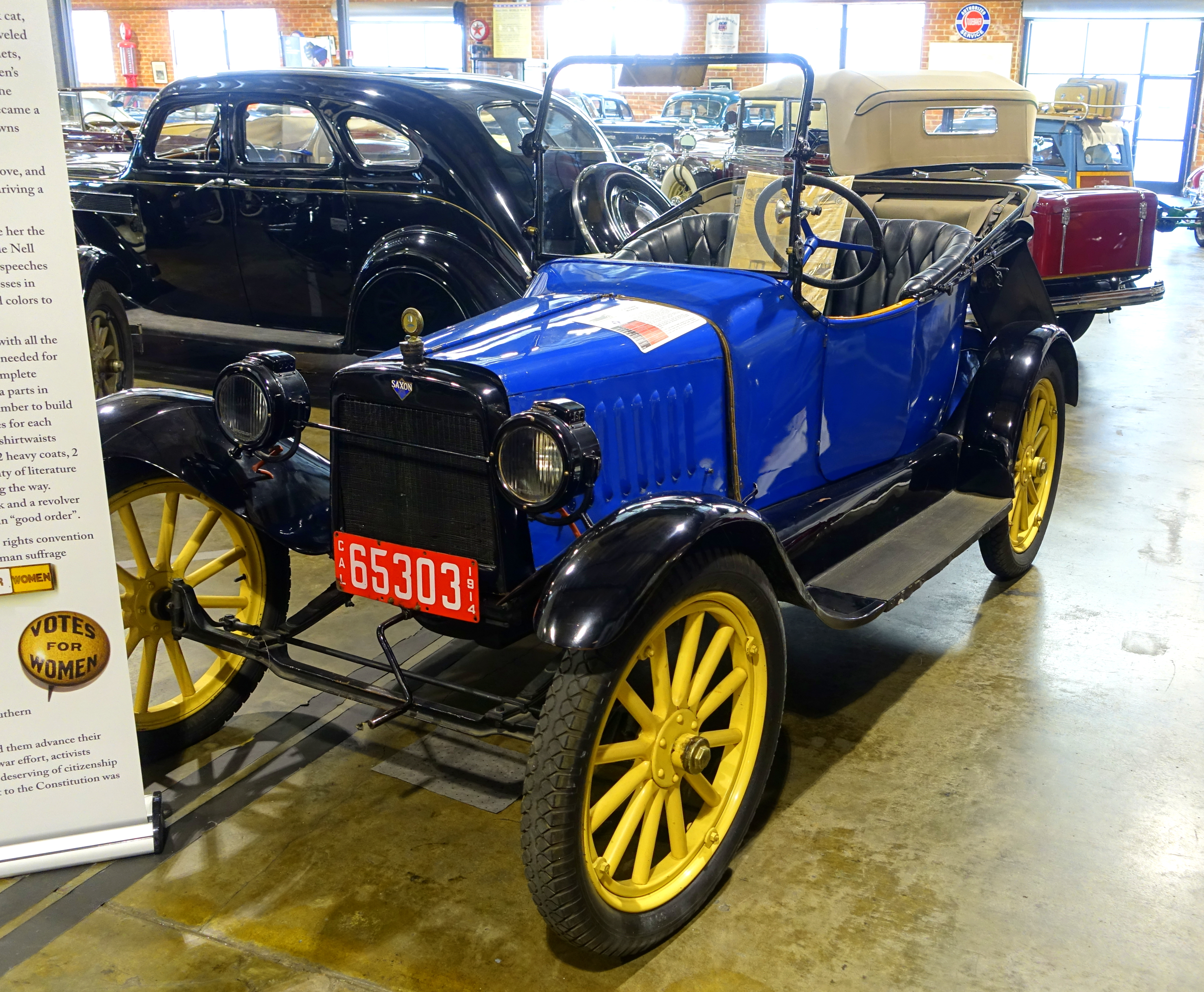
1914 Saxon Model A roadster

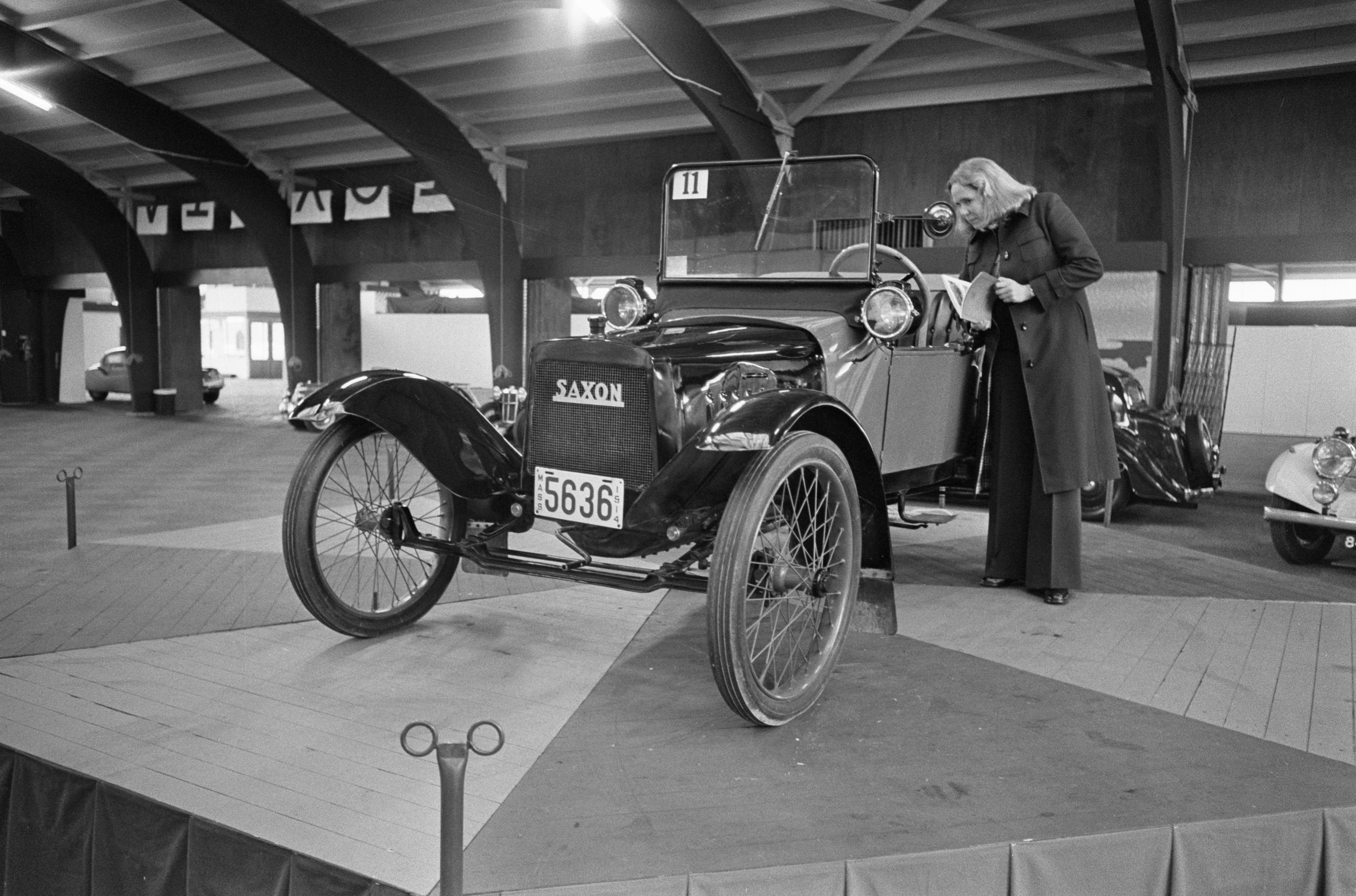
1914 Saxon Model A

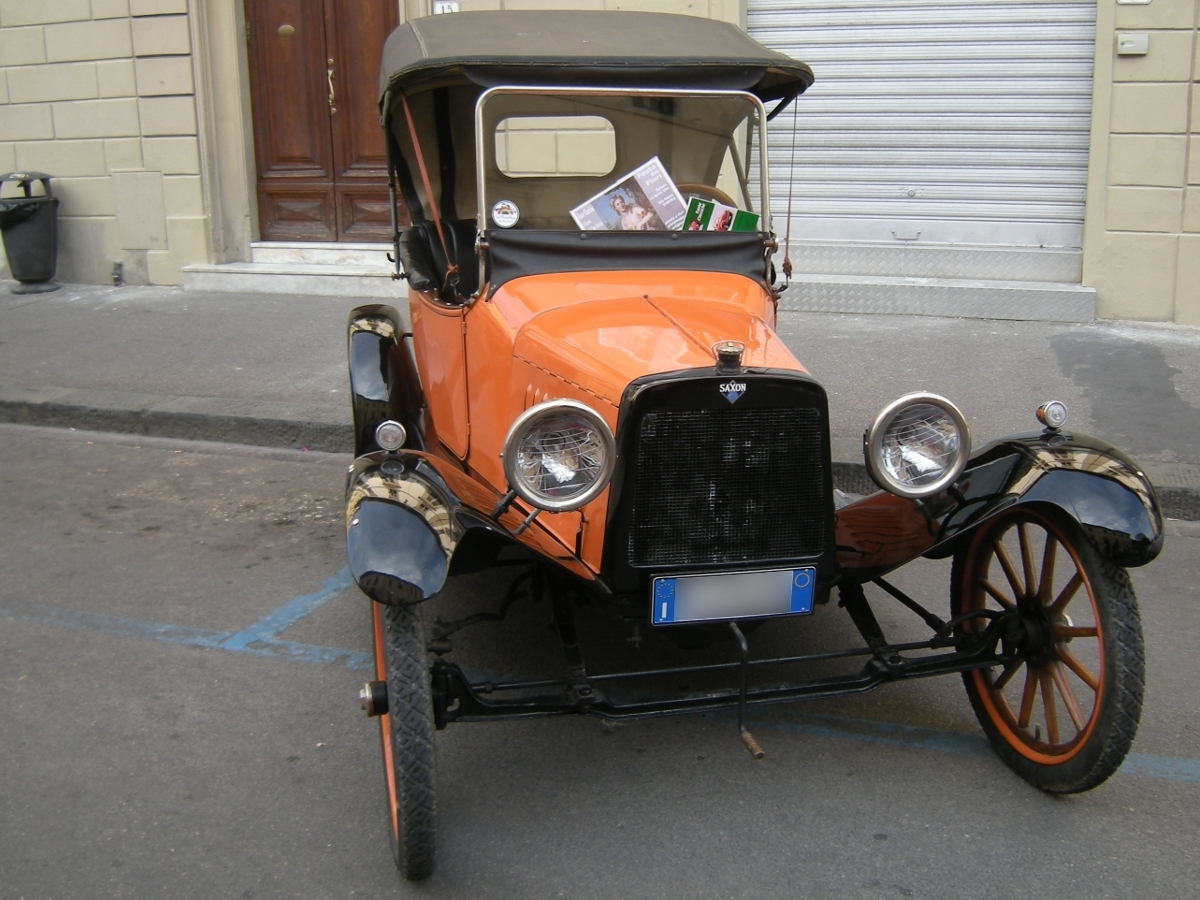
1915 Saxon Runabout

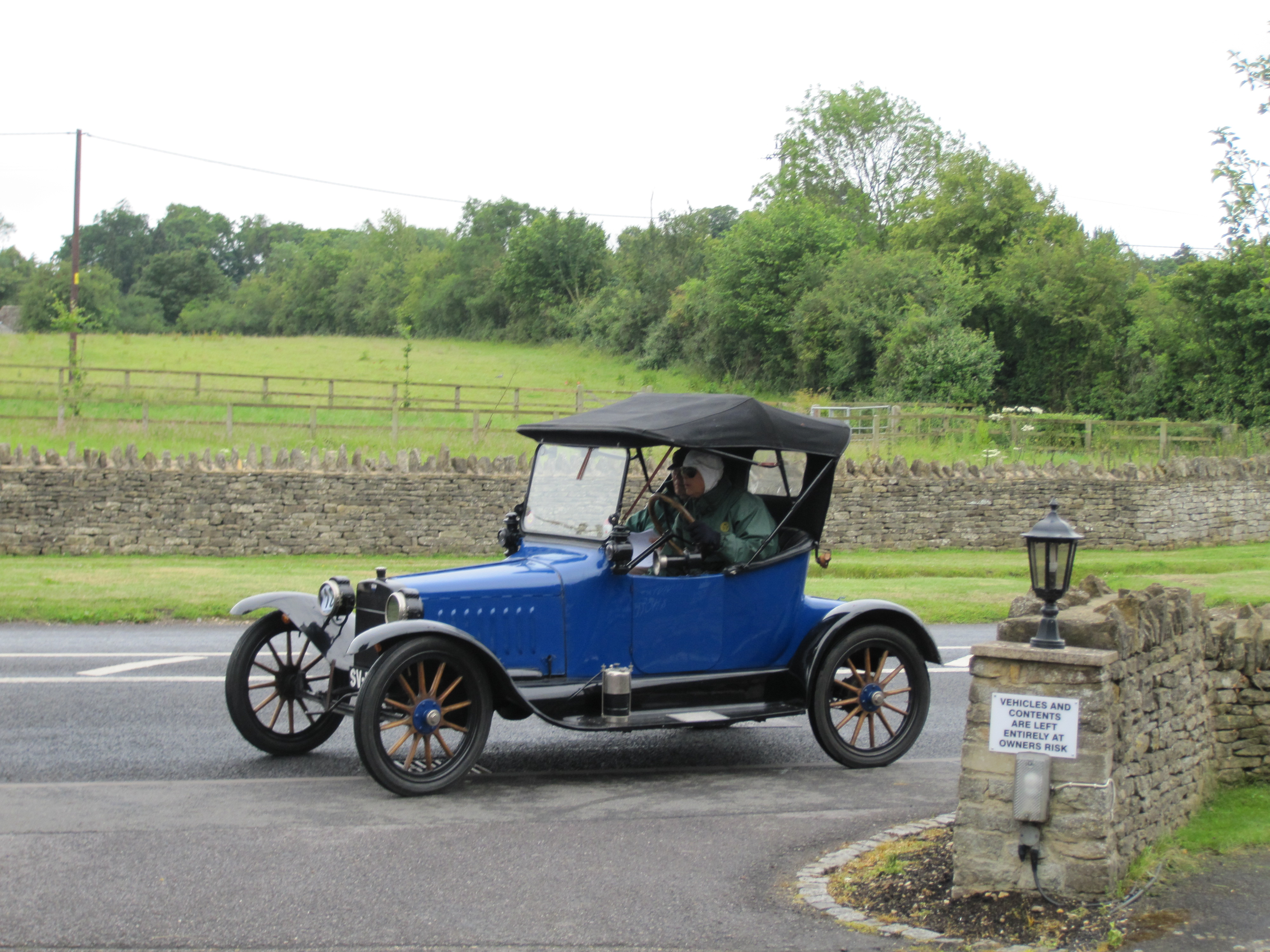
1916 Saxon Model 14 Runabout
4-cylinder Continental engine

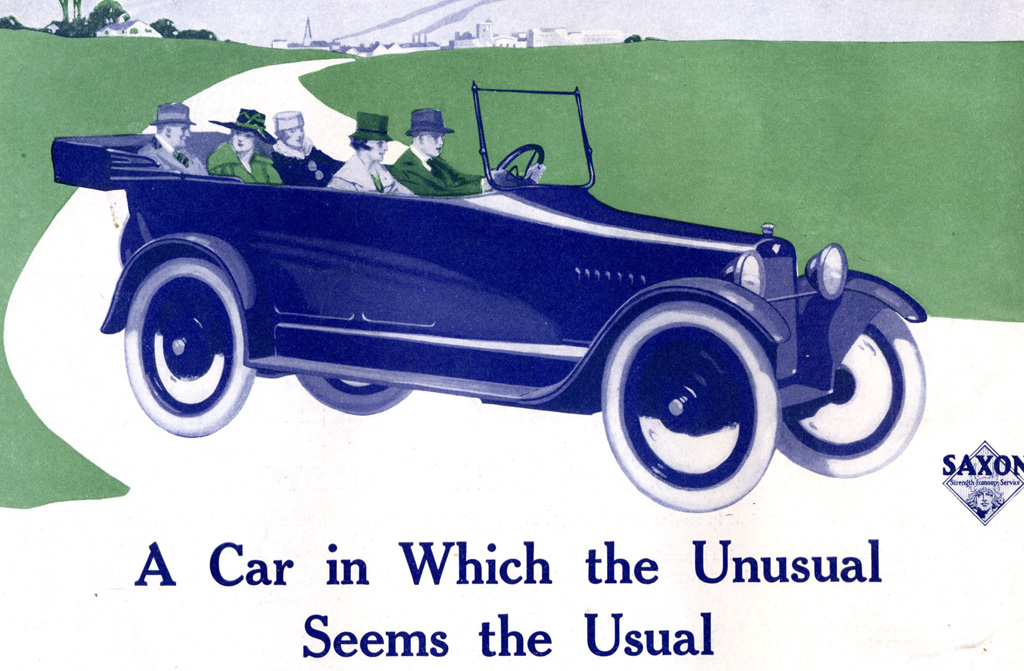
1917 Saxon Six Touring Car
6-cylinder Continental engine

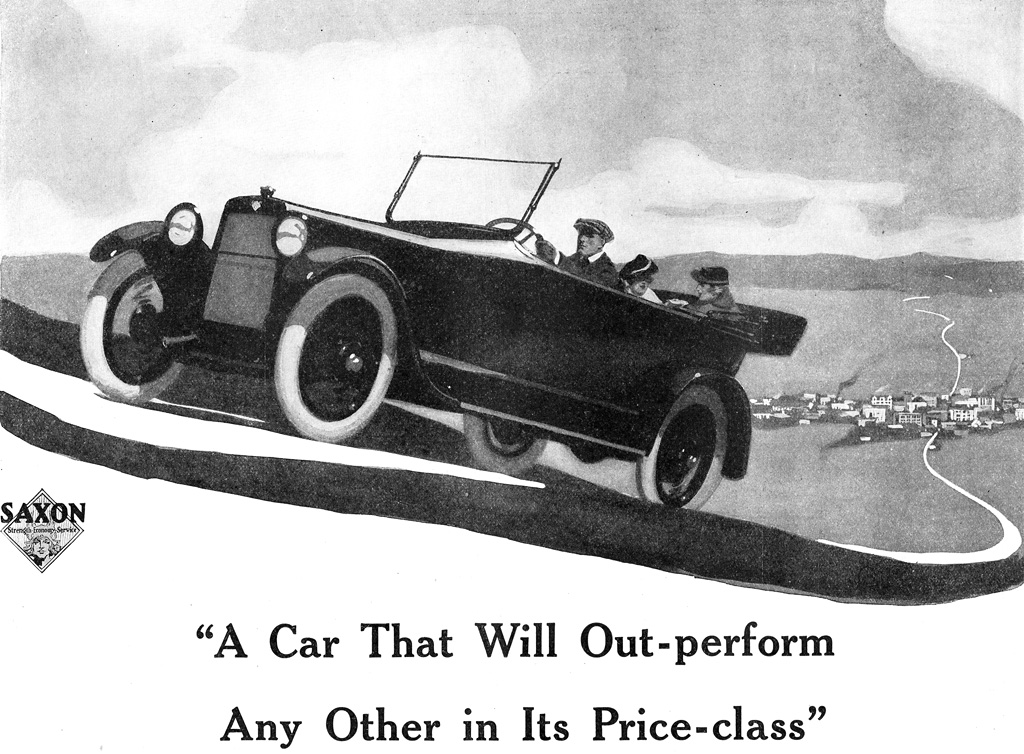
1916 Saxon advertisement

1917 Saxon Six

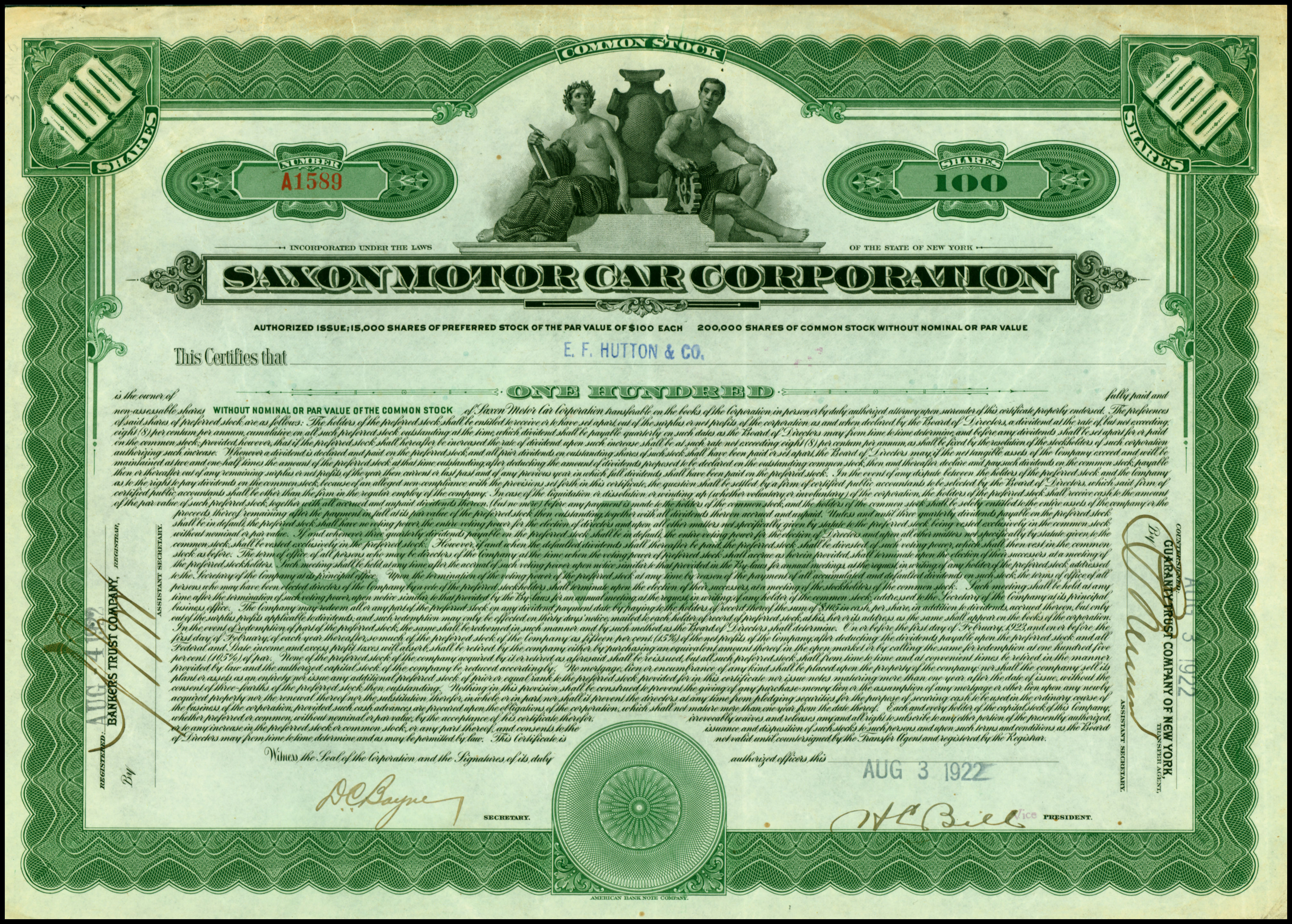
Share of the Saxon Motor Car Corporation, issued 3. August 1922

== Production ==
| Year | Production figures | Production according to Seltzer, Lawrence H. | Production according to Automotiv Industrie |
|---|---|---|---|
| 1914 | 7,127 | 7,300 | |
| 1915 | 11,761 | 19,000 | |
| 1916 | 21,134 | 26,000 | |
| 1917 | 28,219 | 21,000 | |
| 1918 | 12,223 | 7,000 | |
| 1919 | 3,426 | 3,000 | |
| 1920 | 6,110 | 740 | 615 |
| 1921 | 2,173 | 500 | |
| 1922 | 521 | 250 | |
| Sum | 92,694 | 84,790 | |

== In popular culture ==
Band leader George Olsen drove a Saxon. Olsen mentions this on the first Jack Benny Program, May 2, 1932. Olsen was the bandleader on that show.

In the 1937 Hollywood film "Easy Living", Jean Arthur's character, a poor woman mistakenly thought to be rich, is asked to buy a car from the V16 Company of America, and answers that "of course I've never driven one; we had Saxon's... Yes I suppose they are different."

It has been misreported that Saxon President Harry Ford left the company due to illness. The fact is that after raising capital for the company, Ford lost his position in a proxy fight. He subsequently joined the war effort as an officer, and died while a military officer during the influenza epidemic.
