= Lucy Elmina Anthony =

American suffragist (1859–1944)

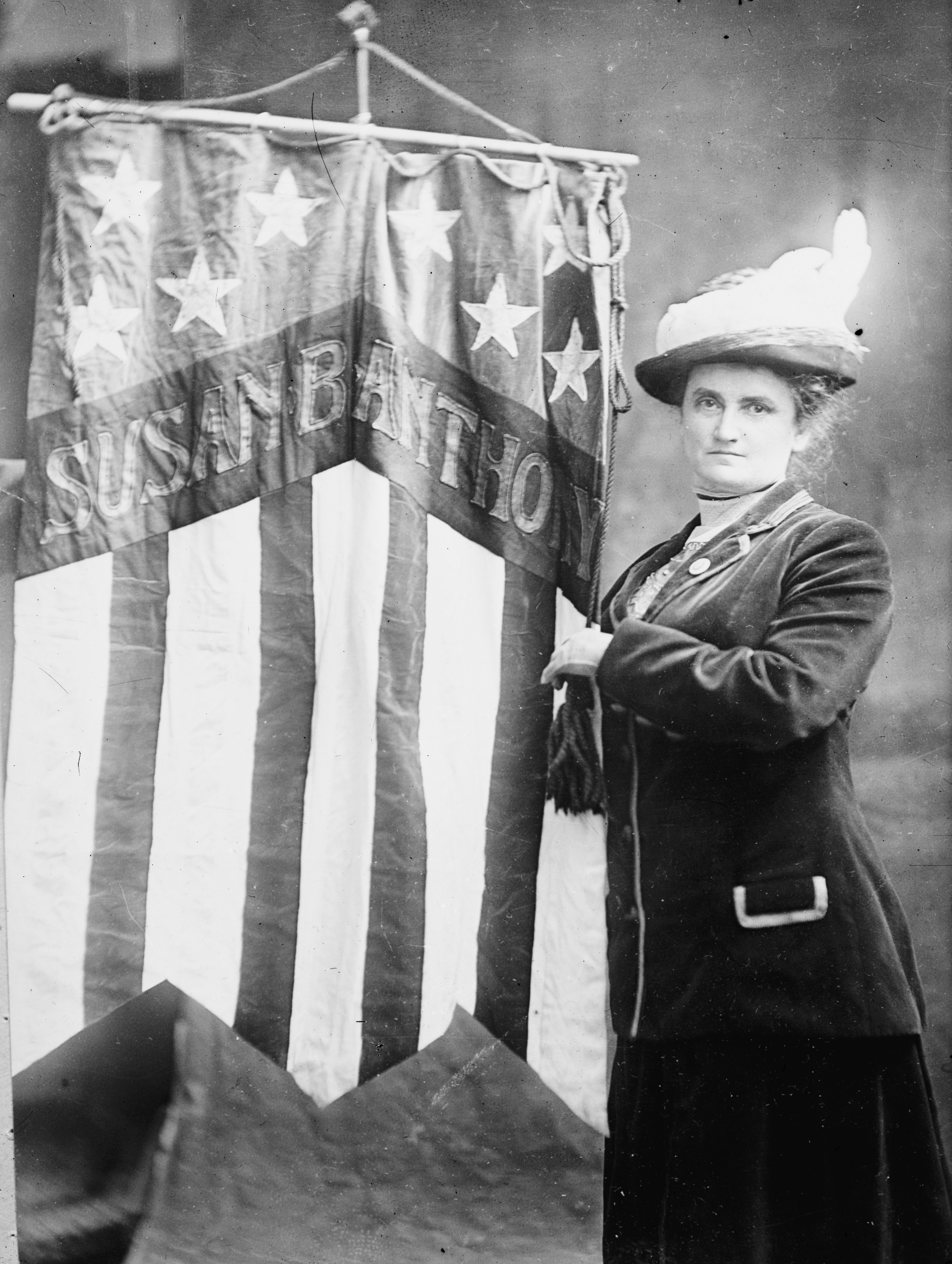
- Born: October 24, 1859; Fort Scott, Kansas
- Died: July 4, 1944 (aged 84); Swarthmore, Pennsylvania
- Education: Rochester Free Academy
- Occupation: Activist
- Partner: Anna Howard Shaw

Lucy Elmina Anthony (October 24, 1859 – July 4, 1944) was an internationally known leader in the American woman's suffrage movement. She was the niece of American social reformer and women's rights activist, Susan B. Anthony, and longtime companion of women's suffrage leader, Anna Howard Shaw. She served as a secretary to both women, as well as on the committee on local arrangements for the National Woman Suffrage Association (NWSA)

== Early life ==
Lucy Elmina Anthony was born on October 24, 1859, in Fort Scott, Kansas. She was the oldest child of Jacob Merritt Anthony (1834–1900), a sewing machine salesman, and Mary Almina Luther (1839–1915). Her paternal aunt was Susan B. Anthony, a prominent suffragist. Anthony's father served in the American Civil War, but little else is known about her early life.

She moved from Kansas to Rochester, New York, in 1880 to attend the Rochester Free Academy, which she graduated from in 1883. While in New York, she lived with her aunts, Susan B. Anthony and Mary S. Anthony, and began assisting behind-the-scenes with the women's suffrage movement. She began a long career as a secretary for her aunt. She also acted as an assistant to Rachel Foster Avery, who Susan B. Anthony was training to become the leader of the National Woman Suffrage Association (NWSA).

== Activism ==
In 1886, Anthony worked with her aunt Susan to try to convince Anna Howard Shaw to leave her current organization, the American Woman Suffrage Association (AWSA), and the two women became close. Conversations about a merger between the NWSA and the AWSA began the same year, and the organizations officially united into the National American Woman Suffrage Association (NAWSA) in 1890. While this unification was being enacted, Anthony, Shaw, and Alice Stone Blackwell compiled The Yellow Ribbon Speaker: Readings and Recitations (1891), a collection of writings on women's suffrage.

Anthony served as Shaw's manager from 1888 until she died in 1919, acting as a business administrator and emotional support, a role for which she received a salary and an assurance that she would receive half of Shaw's belongings. This role included searching for Susan B. Anthony and Shaw as a manager in their world tours. She also worked frequently for the NAWSA itself, coordinating transportation for conferences on the West Coast, working with field offices during state campaigns, and attending most annual conventions. She served on the committee on local arrangements for the NAWSA in 1889, and on the national committee on local arrangements and the committee on railroad rates in 1910. In 1896, Anthony and Elizabeth Sargent arranged a series of conventions in every county in California to promote women's suffrage. After the suffrage victory in 1920, Anthony supported the newly created League of Women Voters and remained active in women's movements throughout her life.

=== Relationship with Anna Howard Shaw ===
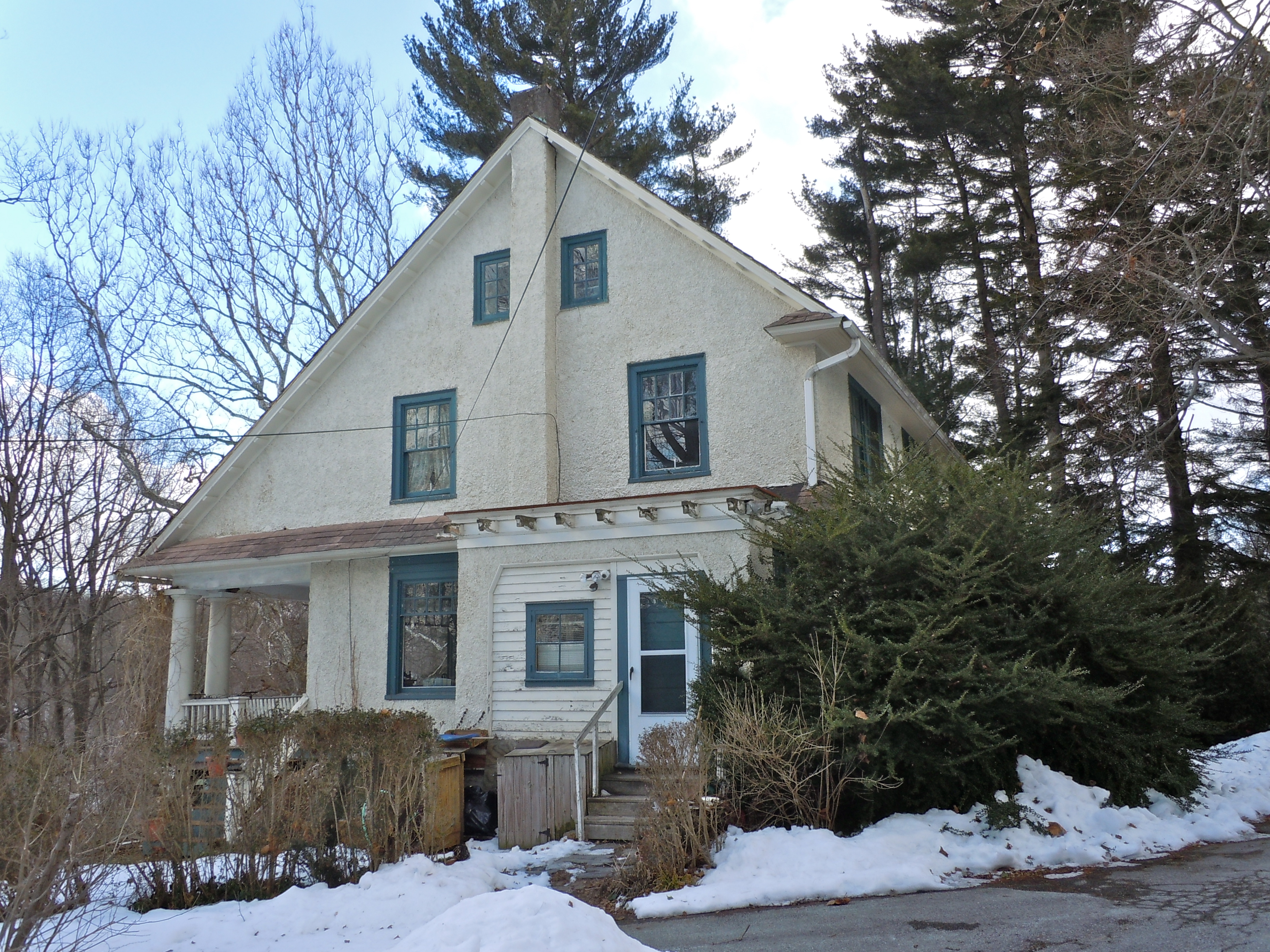
The house in Media, Pennsylvania, where Anthony lived with her companion, Anna Howard Shaw

Susan B. Anthony was initially concerned about the decade age gap between Anthony and Shaw as the two became closer, but she came to encourage the relationship and persuaded them both to move to Philadelphia, Pennsylvania. The couple would become longtime companions. During the 1890s, Anthony and Shaw had a summer home together in Wianno, on the south coast of Cape Cod, which became the focus of an 1895 newspaper article by New York World titled "An Adamless Eden of Women in Bloomers". In 1903, Shaw built a home at 240 Ridley Creek Road, Media, Pennsylvania, where she lived with Anthony until her death. The house was originally held in Shaw's name but she sold it to Anthony for $1 in 1915. Anthony was by Shaw's bedside when she died on July 2, 1919.

After Shaw's death, Anthony focused on creating a biography of Shaw and created memorials to her at Bryn Mawr College and the Women's Medical College of Pennsylvania. She had collected letters and memorabilia from their lives together, and she retained Ida Husted Harper, the author of her aunt's biography, to write a biography for Shaw. However, they had a falling out over the first draft, which was never published.

== Personal life ==
Anthony was the executrix of her aunt and Shaw's estates and the primary beneficiary of the latter's will. Her aunt Mary's will specified that her property was to go to Susan and, on her death, that it would go to Anthony and Shaw. The two of them were also appointed as executors of the will, along with Avery. She was at her aunt Susan's bedside while she was dying in 1906.

Anthony died on July 4, 1944, at the home of a friend, Julia C. Kent, in Swarthmore, Pennsylvania, and in her will, she left the bulk of her estate to the National League of Women Voters and the Philadelphia League of Voters.

== Bibliography ==
- Howard Shaw, Anna; Stone Blackwell, Alice; Anthony, Lucy Elmina (1891). The Yellow Ribbon Speaker: Readings and Recitations. Boston: Lee and Shepard.
