= Jacob Gould =

American politician (1794–1867)

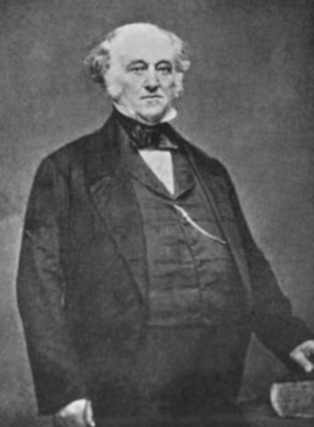

2nd Mayor of Rochester, New York
- In office July 1835 – December 1836
- Preceded by: Jonathan Child
- Succeeded by: Abraham M. Schermerhorn

Personal details
- Born: February 10, 1794 Boxford, Massachusetts, United States
- Died: November 18, 1867 (aged 73) Rochester, New York, United States
- Resting place: Mount Hope Cemetery
- Party: Democratic
- Spouses: Ruby Swan (m. 1816; died 1840) Sarah T. Seward (m. 1847)
- Profession: Shoemaker, businessman

Jacob Gould (February 10, 1794 – November 18, 1867) was the second overall and first Democratic mayor of Rochester, New York.

== Biography ==
Jacob Gould was born in Boxford, Massachusetts on February 10, 1794.

He arrived in Rochester from Massachusetts as a school teacher and became one of the area's first shoemakers. He was a general in the New York State Militia. After his one-year term as mayor, Gould went on to work for Rochester banks, railroads, and at the University of Rochester as one of the school's first trustees.

He is also notable for having fought against the acquisition by the city of the land for Mount Hope Cemetery. Gould declared the hilly land was not "fit for pasturing rabbits." Despite this, he became one of the first people to buy a plot in the new cemetery.

== Personal life ==
Gould married Ruby Swan in 1816, and they had three children. She died in 1840, and he remarried to Sarah T. Seward in 1847. They had three children.

He died in Rochester on November 18, 1867.

Preceded by Jonathan Child	Mayor of Rochester, NY; July 1835– December 1836	Succeeded by Abraham M. Schermerhorn
