= Thomas H. Rochester =

American mayor (1797–1874)

Thomas Hart Rochester

6th Mayor of Rochester, New York
- In office December 1838 – December 1839
- Preceded by: Elisha Johnson
- Succeeded by: Samuel George Andrews

Personal details
- Born: September 23, 1797 Hagerstown, Maryland
- Died: October 6, 1874 (aged 77) Rochester, New York
- Party: Whig
- Spouse: Phebe E. Cuming
- Profession: Miller, Banker

Thomas Hart Rochester (September 23, 1797 – October 6, 1874) was the 6th son of Colonel Nathaniel Rochester and the 6th mayor of Rochester, New York. Nathaniel Rochester was his father, William B. Rochester was his brother, and William Beatty Rochester Jr. was his nephew.

Rochester was born in Hagerstown, Maryland and moved with his family to Dansville, New York in 1810. Rochester was the first of his family to move to the land his father Nathaniel, Charles Carroll, and William Fitzhugh purchased next to the High Falls of the Genesee River. When his family followed him to the city two years later, he decided to move briefly to Missouri before returning and marrying Phebe E. Cuming, the daughter of the village of Rochester's first clergyman.

Rochester was selected by the Common Council as a Whig to be Mayor during the depression year of 1838. After his term, he became a banker and real estate developer before his death in 1874. He is interred in Mount Hope Cemetery.

His Spring Street house served as the home of the Rochester Police Locust Club from 1921 to 1964. It was demolished in 1964.

Preceded by Elisha Johnson	Mayor of Rochester, NY; December 1838-December 1839	Succeeded by Samuel George Andrews
