= Elijah F. Smith =

American politician

8th Mayor of Rochester, New York
- In office 1840–1842
- Preceded by: Samuel G. Andrews
- Succeeded by: Charles J. Hill

Personal details
- Born: December 1792 Groton, Connecticut
- Died: September 12, 1879 (aged 86) Rochester, New York
- Party: Whig
- Profession: Store owner, Banker

Elijah F. Smith (December 1792 – September 12, 1879) was the 8th mayor of Rochester, New York.

== Biography ==
Smith came to Rochester from Groton, Connecticut in 1826 when he opened a store, Smith & Perkins, on Main Street. He became involved in city affairs and served as an alderman before 1840 when he was elected Mayor. He was the first Mayor of Rochester to be elected by the people of the city, following an 1840 New York State law requiring that all mayors be publicly elected. In March 1841, Smith was reelected to a second term. His time in office saw the annexation to the city of the Mount Hope Cemetery area, but other improvements were prevented by the ongoing national depression.

After his term as Mayor, Smith held other offices in the city. He served as a trustee for the University of Rochester until his death in 1880. He is buried in Mount Hope Cemetery.

Preceded by Samuel G. Andrews	Mayor of Rochester, NY; 1840–1842	Succeeded by Charles J. Hill
