= Jonathan Child House & Brewster–Burke House Historic District =

- Jonathan Child House & Brewster-Burke House Historic District
- U.S. National Register of Historic Places
- U.S. Historic district
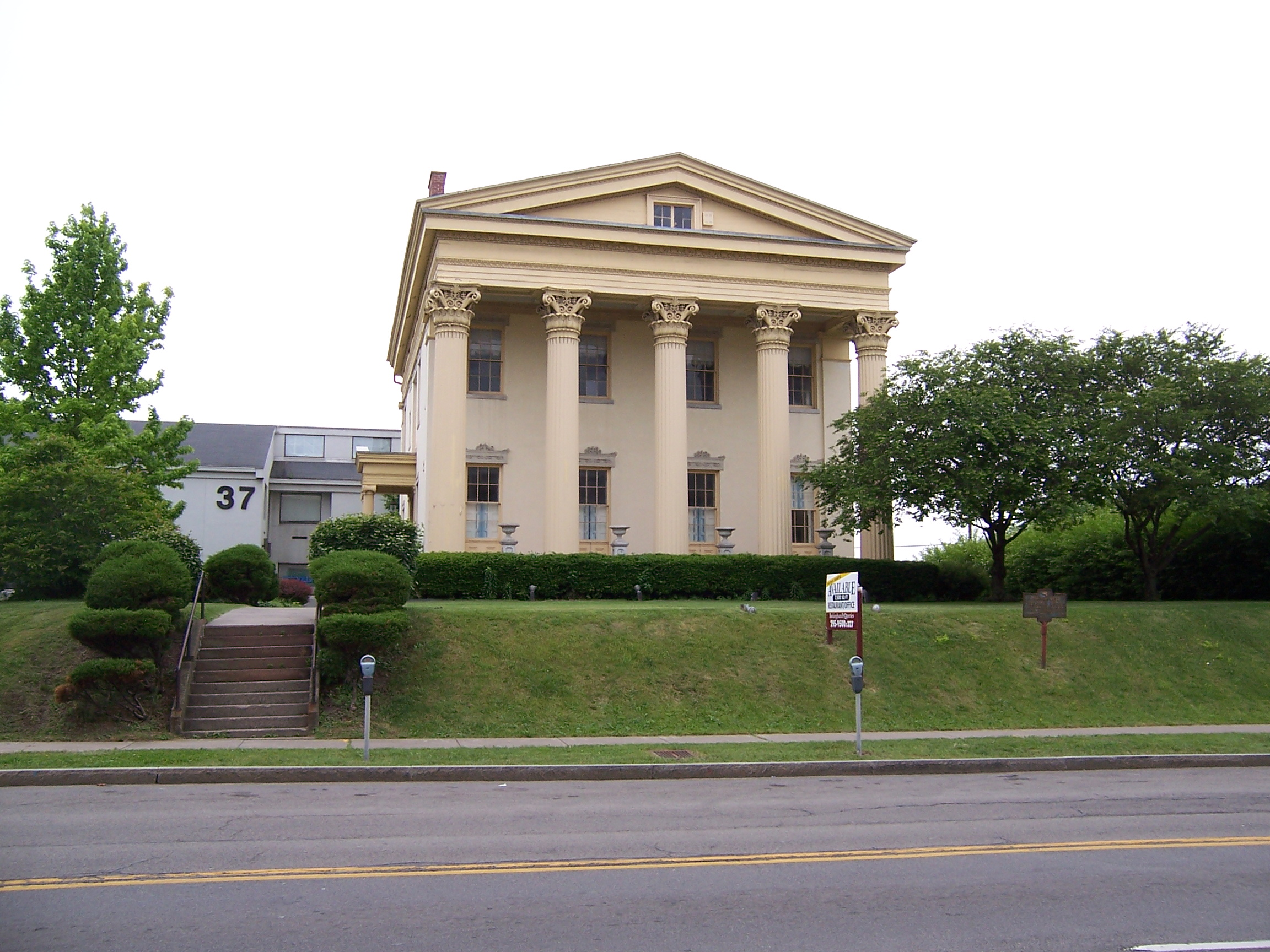
- The front of the Jonathan Child House in June 2010

- Location within New York Location within the United States
- Location: 37 S. Washington St. and 130 Spring St., Rochester, New York
- Coordinates: 43°9′10″N 77°37′1″W
- Area: less than one acre
- Built: 1837
- Architect: Bragdon, Claude; Et al.
- Architectural style: Greek Revival, Italianate
- NRHP reference No.: 71000543
- Added to NRHP: February 18, 1971

Jonathan Child House & Brewster–Burke House Historic District is a national historic district containing a set of two historic homes located at Rochester in Monroe County, New York.

The Jonathan Child House, located at 37 S. Washington St. was constructed 1837-1838 by Jonathan Child (1785–1860), Rochester's first mayor and son-in-law of the city's founder Nathaniel Rochester. It features a monumental two story portico and is a fine example of the Greek Revival style. The building has seen a number of uses since Child sold it in the 1840s, including once as a boarding house called The Pillars. As of Fall 2012, the building is slated to open as Rochester Pillars, a special-events venue.

The Brewster-Burke House, located at 130 Spring St., is a fine example of the Italianate style. The house features a hipped roof with cupola and an entrance porch with carved Moorish Revival ornamentation.

It was listed on the National Register of Historic Places in 1971.

== Images ==
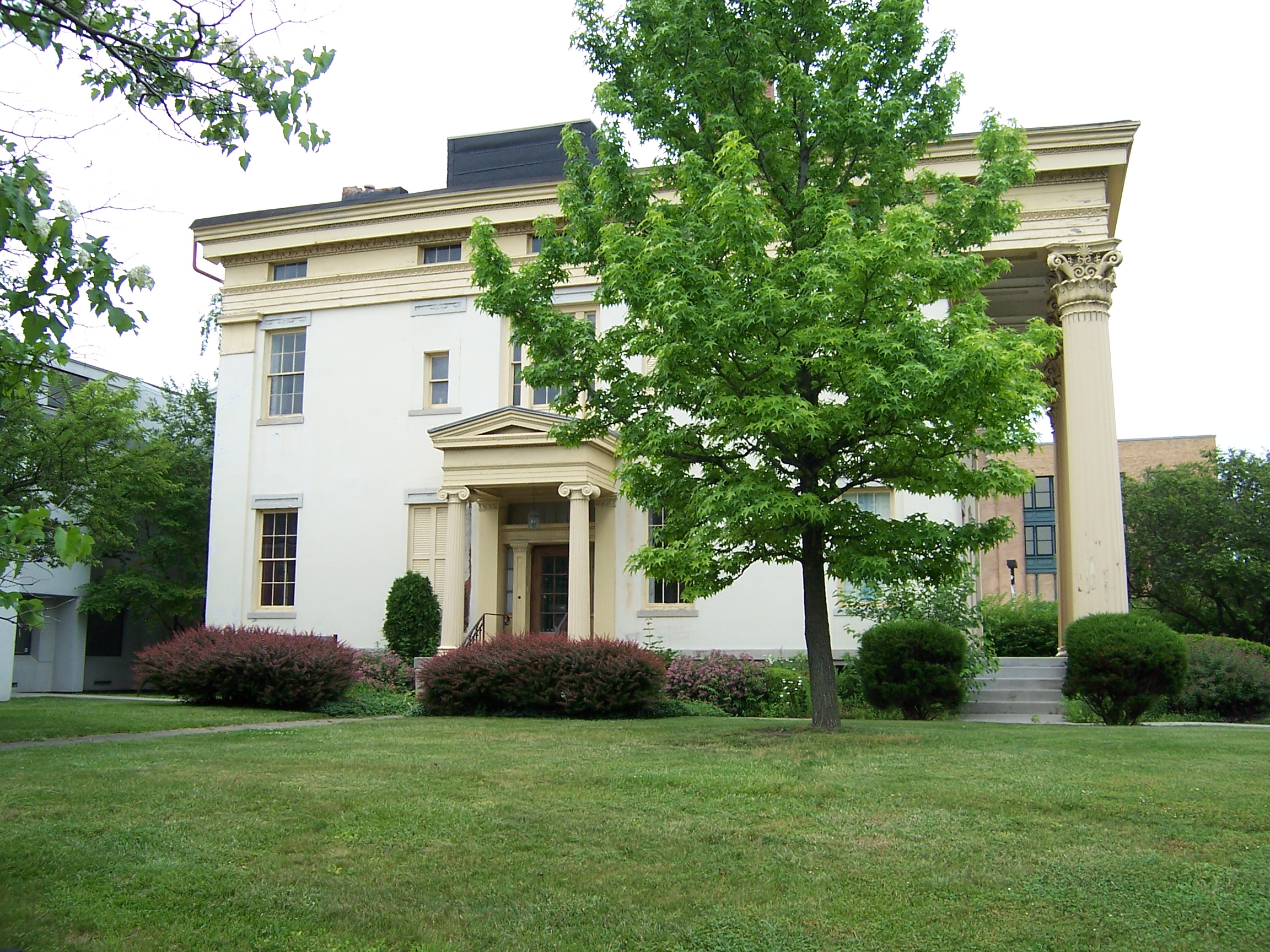
The Jonathan Child House, side view (facing the Brewster–Burke House)

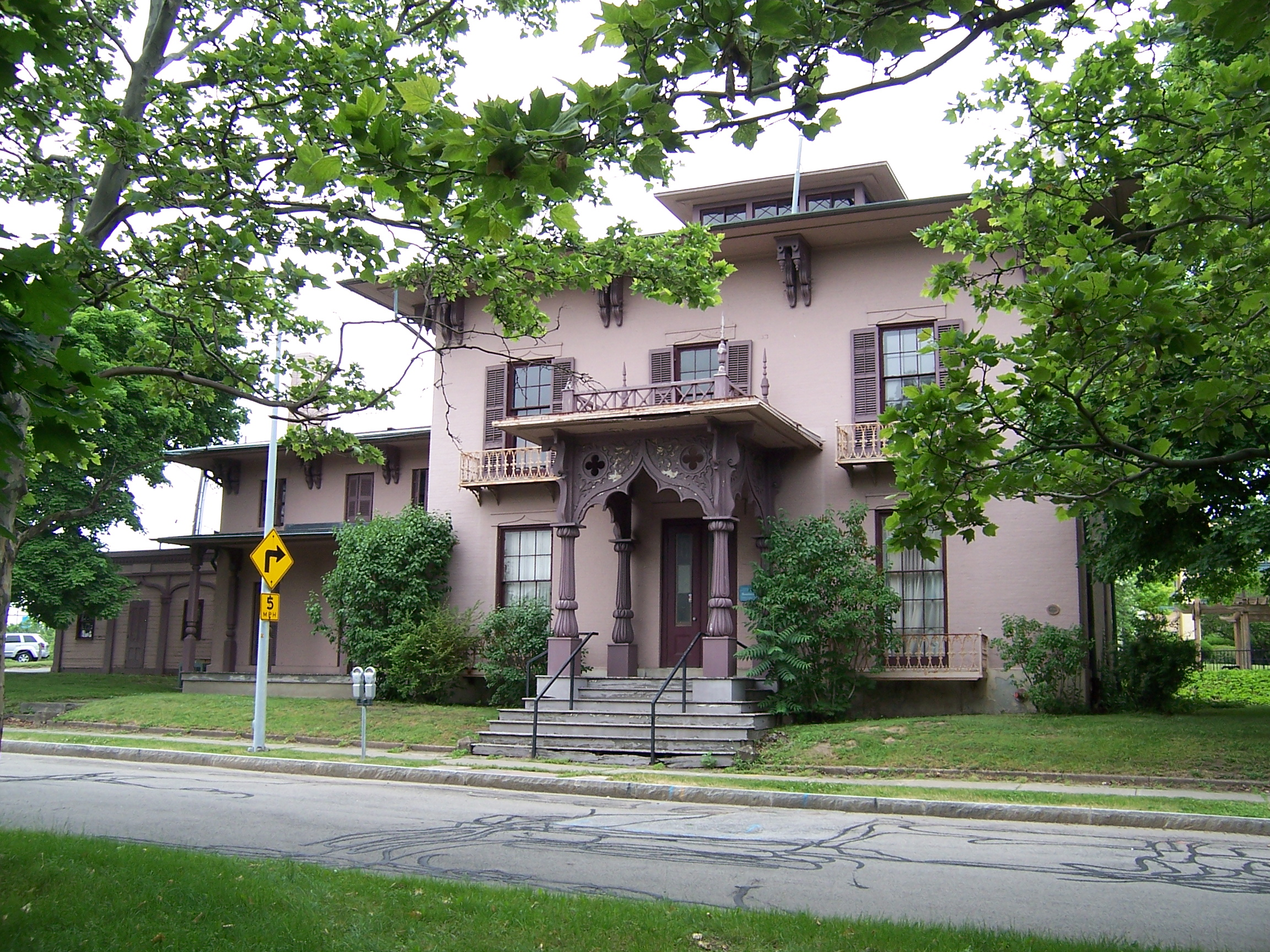
The Brewster–Burke House, front view

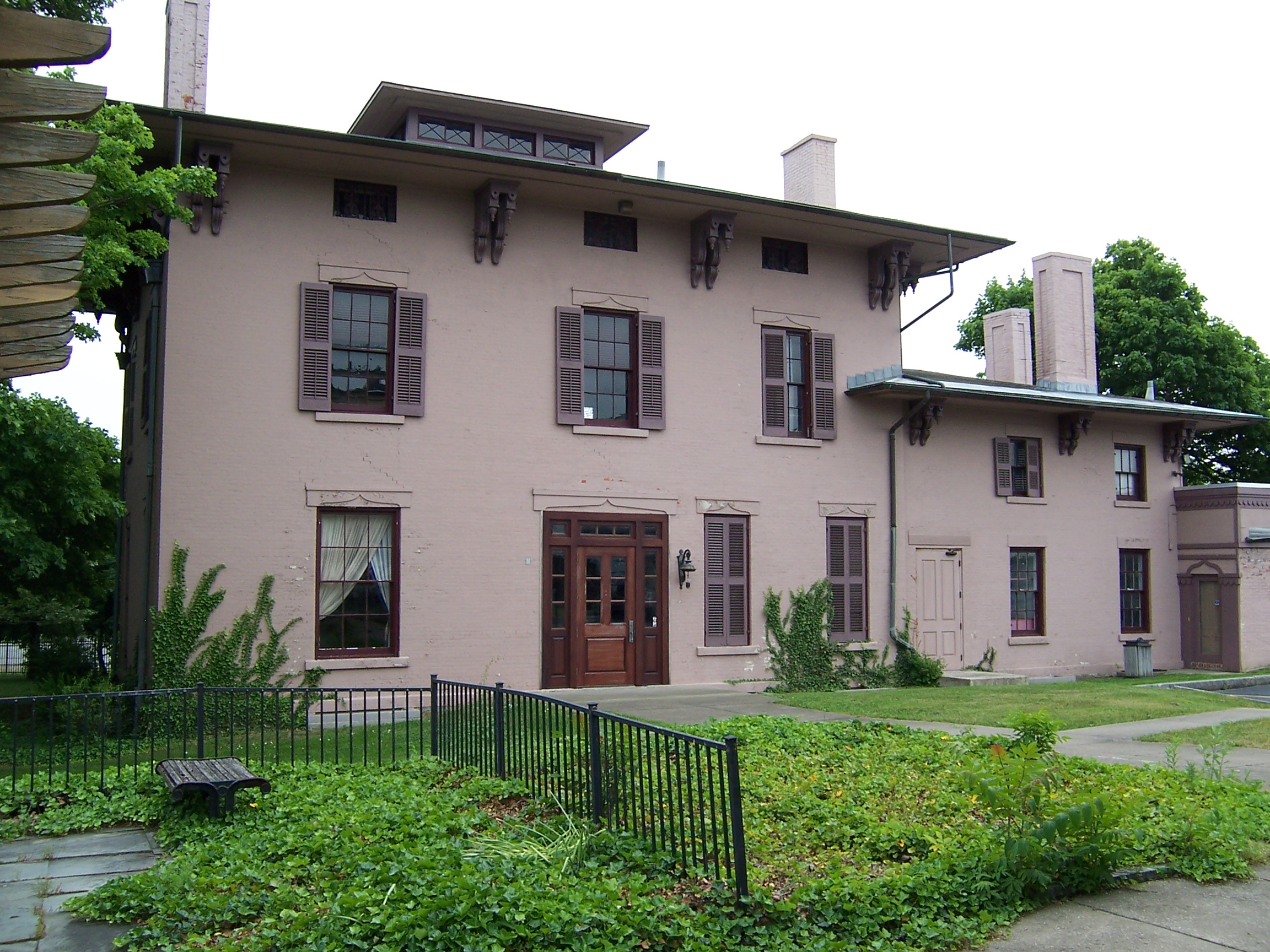
The Brewster–Burke House, back view (facing the Jonathan Child House)

== See also ==
- National Register of Historic Places listings in Rochester, New York
