= Lucy Sprague =

Lucy Sprague can refer to:

- Lucy J. Sprague, born Earle (1851–1903), American suffragist
- Lucy Sprague Mitchell (1878–1967), American educator
