= William B. Rochester =

American lawyer and politician (1789–1838)

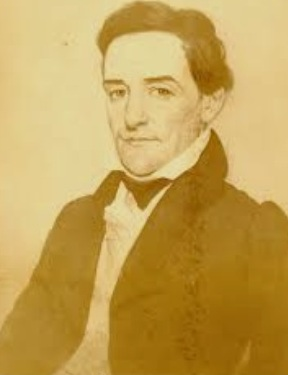
- Portrait c. 1821. Buffalo History Museum (Buffalo, New York).

Member of the U.S. House of Representatives from New York
- In office December 3, 1821 – April 21, 1823
- Preceded by: Caleb Baker; Jonathan Richmond
- Succeeded by: William Woods
- Constituency: 20th district (1821–23); 28th district (1823)

Personal details
- Born: William Beatty Rochester; January 29, 1789 Hagerstown, Maryland, U.S.
- Died: June 14, 1838 (aged 49) Coast of North Carolina, U.S.
- Party: Democratic-Republican
- Spouses: Harriet Irwin (m. 1812; died 1815) Amanda Hopkins (m. 1816; died 1831) Eliza Hatch Powers (m. 1832)
- Relations: Thomas Rochester (brother)
- Children: 8
- Parent(s): Nathaniel Rochester; Sophia Beatty
- Education: Charlotte Hall Military Academy

William Beatty Rochester (January 29, 1789 Hagerstown, Maryland – June 14, 1838) was an American lawyer and politician from New York.

== Early life ==
Rochester was the first child of Col. Nathaniel Rochester (1752–1831), founder of the City of Rochester, New York, and Sophia (née Beatty) Rochester (1768–1845). Mayor Thomas H. Rochester was his brother.

He attended the public schools and graduated from Charlotte Hall Military Academy.

== Career ==
During the War of 1812, Rochester was an aide-de-camp to Gen. George McClure. After the war, he studied law with his uncle Judge Adam Beatty and with Henry Clay, was admitted to the bar, and began practice in Bath, New York. Later, he removed to Angelica, New York.

Rochester was a member of the New York State Assembly (Allegany and Steuben Co.) in 1816-17 and 1818. Rochester was a presidential elector in 1820, voting for James Monroe and Daniel D. Tompkins.

Rochester was elected as a Democratic-Republican to the 17th, and re-elected as a Crawford Democratic-Republican to the 18th United States Congress, holding office from December 3, 1821, until 1823. He was appointed as Judge of the Eight Circuit Court on April 21, 1823, and resigned from the House of Representatives. He resigned from the bench to run on the Bucktails ticket for Governor of New York in 1826, but was narrowly defeated by DeWitt Clinton.

He was Secretary to the Special Envoy Extraordinary and Minister Plenipotentiary to Colombia in 1826, and Chargé d'affaires to Central America in 1827–28. He was appointed Chargé d'Affaires of Guatemala on March 3, 1827, and was commissioned to the Republic of Central America. He reached Central America, but returned to the United States without presenting credentials.

=== Later career ===
In 1828, he was appointed by Nicholas Biddle as president of the branch of the Second Bank of the United States at Buffalo, New York, remaining there until 1836. He later served as president of the Bank of Pensacola, Florida and a director of the Alabama and Florida Railroad.

== Personal life ==
In 1812, he married his first wife Harriet Irwin (d. 1815), and their son was:

- Nathaniel Montgomery Rochester (1813–1823).

On January 31, 1816, he married his second wife Amanda Hopkins (1799–1831), and their children were:

- James Hervey Rochester (1819–1860), who married Evelina Throop Martin (1822–1907), a niece of Gov. Enos T. Throop
- Harriet Louisa Rochester (1821–1854), who married Hugh L. Bull
- Sophia Elizabeth Rochester (1823–1824)

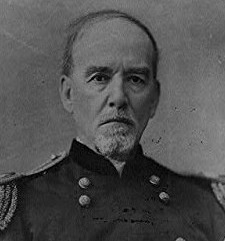
Brig General William Beatty Rochester Jr Paymaster-General of the United States Army 1882–1890

- William Beatty Rochester Jr. (1826–1909), a brigadier general of the United States Army
- Nathaniel Elie Rochester (1829–1833).

On April 9, 1832, he married his third wife Eliza (née Hatch) Powers (1800–1885), a half-sister of Gov. Enos T. Throop and the widow of U.S. Rep. Gershom Powers. Together, William and Eliza were the parents of:

- Eliza Hatch Rochester (1833–1868), who married Augus B. Fitch
- George William Rochester (1835–1837).

Rochester died in the steamship Pulaski disaster off the coast of North Carolina on June 14, 1838.

Party political offices
Preceded by Samuel Young	Bucktails nominee for Governor of New York; 1826	Succeeded by None
U.S. House of Representatives
Preceded by Caleb Baker, Jonathan Richmond	Member of the U.S. House of Representatives from New York's 20th congressional district 1821 - 1823 with David Woodcock	Succeeded by Ela Collins, Egbert Ten Eyck
New district	Member of the U.S. House of Representatives from New York's 28th congressional district 1823	Succeeded by William Woods
