= Jonathan Child =

American businessman and politician (1785–1860)

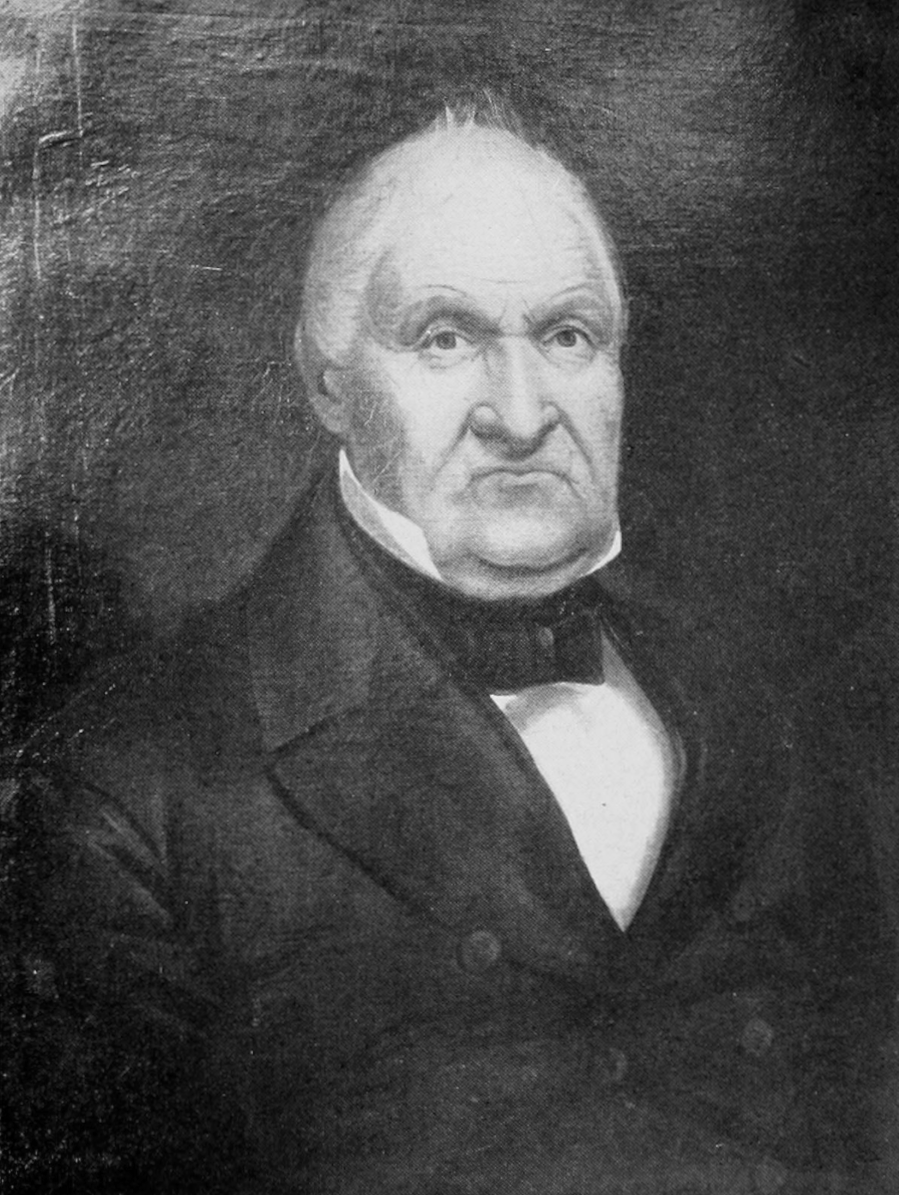

1st Mayor of Rochester, New York
- In office 1834–1835
- Preceded by: (none)
- Succeeded by: Jacob Gould

Personal details
- Born: January 30, 1785 Lyme, New Hampshire
- Died: October 27, 1860 (aged 75) Buffalo, New York
- Party: Whig
- Spouse: Sophia Rochester
- Relations: Nathaniel Rochester
- Profession: Businessman

Jonathan Child (January 30, 1785 – October 27, 1860) was an American businessman and politician. He was the first Mayor of Rochester, New York and son-in-law of Colonel Nathaniel Rochester.

== Early life ==
Child was born in New Hampshire, and in 1805, at the age of 20, he moved to Utica, New York. In 1810, he moved to Charlotte, New York, and then during the War of 1812, he moved to Bloomfield, New York, and opened up a store in part of a local tavern. While in Bloomfield, he met Sophia, the oldest daughter of Colonel Rochester.

== Career ==
In 1816, Child was a representative to the New York State Assembly in Albany. In 1820, he moved to Rochester and opened a store at the Four Corners there. When the Erie Canal was completed, he operated a fleet of canal boats on those waters. He later helped organize and build the Tonawanda Railroad, the first in Rochester. In 1824, he became a trustee of the First Bank of Rochester, and in 1827, became a village trustee.

In June 1834, the Whig majority of the first Rochester city council, selected Child to be the first mayor – Rochester mayors were not elected by popular vote until 1840. He resigned the next spring after newly elected Democrats in the city council authorized granting liquor licenses in Rochester. After his resignation, Child built a mansion on Washington Street in Rochester, and using some of his canal boats, became an early importer of coal.

== Death and legacy ==
After his wife Sophia died in 1850, Child moved to Buffalo, New York, where he died ten years later on October 27, 1860. His Rochester home was listed on the National Register of Historic Places in 1971 as part of the Jonathan Child House & Brewster-Burke House Historic District.

Preceded by (none)	Mayor of Rochester, NY; 1834–1835	Succeeded by Jacob Gould
