= Elisha Johnson =

American politician

5th Mayor of Rochester, New York
- In office 1838 – December 1838
- Preceded by: Thomas Kempshall
- Succeeded by: Thomas H. Rochester

Personal details
- Born: 1785 Chautauqua County, New York, U.S.
- Died: 1866 (aged 80–81) Ithaca, New York, U.S.
- Profession: Engineer

Elisha Johnson (1785–1866) was an engineer and early resident of Rochester, New York. He served the then village as its fifth mayor.

== Early life ==
Elisahe Johnson was born in 1785 in Chautauqua County, New York. He graduated from Williams College.

== Career ==
Johnson moved to Rochester in 1817 and purchased 80 acres (320,000 m^{2}) of land on the east bank of the Genesee River from Enos Stone. Johnson built a horse railroad to Carthage by the Lower Falls of the Genesee and was the chief engineer and contractor of the Tonawanda Railroad. Johnson became the mayor of Rochester in 1838 and came up with a plan for the construction of a water works through the village that was rejected by the Common Council. At the end of his term Johnson became an engineer for the Genesee Valley Canal and moved to Portageville, New York, where he built the Hornby Lodge.

Johnson built the Tellico River Mansion on his plantation in Tellico Plains, Tennessee and, with his brother and former Mayor of Buffalo, Ebenezer Johnson, purchased the Tellico Iron and Manufacturing Company. During the American Civil War, Union Army General William Sherman's soldiers destroyed the Tellico Iron Works, but Sherman acquitted Johnson for his part in supplying the Confederate Army because of Johnson's northern birth and sympathies. Johnson then moved to Ithaca, New York.

== Death ==
Johnson died in 1866 in Ithaca, New York.

Preceded by Thomas Kempshall	Mayor of Rochester, NY; 1838-December 1838	Succeeded by Thomas H. Rochester
