= William B. Rochester (general) =

US Army paymaster-general

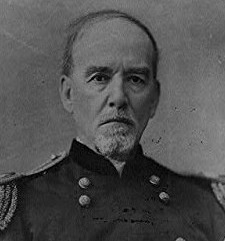
- Library of Congress photo, c. 1882
- Born: February 15, 1826; Angelica, New York, US
- Died: November 11, 1909 (aged 83); Washington, D.C., US
- Burial place: Arlington National Cemetery
- Spouse: Anna Lawrence Martin (m. 1862–1905)
- Children: 4
- Relatives: William B. Rochester (father); Thomas H. Rochester (uncle); Nathaniel Rochester (grandfather)
- Military career
- Allegiance: Union; United States
- Service: Union Army; United States Army
- Service years: (1861–1867) (Union Army) (1867–1890) (US Army)
- Rank: Brigadier General
- Unit: U.S. Army Pay Department
- Commands: Chief Paymaster, District of New Mexico; Chief Paymaster, Department of the South; Paymaster-General of the United States Army
- Wars: American Civil War

William B. Rochester (15 February 1826 – 11 November 1909) was a career officer in the United States Army. A veteran of the American Civil War, he attained the rank of brigadier general while assigned as Paymaster-General of the United States Army from 1882 to 1890.

A native of Angelica, New York, Rochester was the son of judge and legislator William B. Rochester (1789–1838). He was also the grandson of Nathaniel Rochester, the founder of Rochester, New York, and nephew of Thomas H. Rochester, who served as the city's mayor. Rochester pursued a business career in Buffalo, New York until 1851, when he moved to California during the California gold rush. Rochester resided in Sacramento, where he became an agent of the Wells Fargo Express Company.

In 1859, Rochester returned to New York. He joined the Union Army for the American Civil War and was commissioned as a major in the Pay Department. He served until the end of the war, and in July 1865 he received a brevet promotion to lieutenant colonel in recognition of his wartime accomplishments.

In 1867, Rochester was commissioned in the regular army, and was appointed chief paymaster of the District of New Mexico. Subsequent assignments included chief paymaster of the Department of the South. In 1882, Rochester was appointed as the army's paymaster-general with the rank of brigadier general. He served until 1890, when he attained the mandatory retirement age of 64.

In retirement, Rochester resided in Washington, DC and spent summers at Vineyard Haven, Massachusetts. He died in Washington on 11 November 1909. Rochester was buried at Arlington National Cemetery.

== Early life ==
William Beatty Rochester was born in Angelica, New York on 15 February 1826, a son of William B. Rochester (1789–1838) and Amanda (Hopkins) Rochester. Nathaniel Rochester was his grandfather and Thomas H. Rochester was his uncle. He was educated in western New York and trained for a business career. Rochester pursued Buffalo, New York ventures including grain sales and operation of a grain elevator until 1851, when the California gold rush caused him to move to Sacramento, California. He was an agent for the Wells Fargo & Co. banking firm until 1857, when he resigned. Among his ventures after leaving Wells Fargo was purchase of Sacramento's State Journal newspaper. As an experienced banker, Rochester aided in funding California's government, including financing state expenses through the issuing of bonds. In addition, he was one of the individuals who provided surety bonds for government officials including the Sacramento city treasurer. In 1859, Rochester returned to New York.

=== Marriage ===
In June 1862, Rochester married Anna Lawrence Martin of Albany, New York. They were the parents of four children: Annie, William, Henry, and Alice.

== Career ==
At the start of the American Civil War, Rochester joined the Union Army and in July 1861 he was commissioned as a paymaster with the rank of major, with a date of rank of 1 June. He continued to perform paymaster duties at the Pay Department headquarters until the end of the war, and his meritorious service was recognized in 1867 with a brevet promotion to lieutenant colonel.

Following the war's end, in 1867, Rochester was commissioned as a major in the regular army's pay department and appointed chief paymaster of the District of New Mexico. While in New Mexico, Rochester earned accolades from local merchants and businessmen for his facilitation of banking transactions between New Mexico and the large institutions of New York City. Previous paymasters had charged a one percent premium for handling these exchanges, but Rochester did it at no cost.

In 1870, Rochester was assigned to paymaster duties at the Washington, D.C. headquarters of the army's Pay Department. In 1871, paymaster Major John Ledyard Hodge was found to have embezzled nearly $500,000 (about $13.5 million in 2025), which he had lost in speculative investments; he was imprisoned, and Rochester was assigned to take over his accounts and resolve outstanding pay issues. (Note: Hodge surrendered all his personal property as partial reimbursement. After 13 months in prison, in late 1872 he received clemency from President Ulysses S. Grant.) In July 1872, Rochester was assigned to paymaster duties in Louisville, Kentucky. In 1878, Rochester was appointed chief paymaster of the Department of the South, which was headquartered at Newport Barracks, Kentucky.

In February 1882, President Chester A. Arthur nominated Rochester for assignment as Paymaster-General of the United States Army with the rank of brigadier general. In making the appointment, Arthur advanced Rochester over 10 paymaster officers who were senior to him. In October 1885, Rochester donated to the Buffalo Historical Society an exchange of Civil War correspondence from 1862 between President Abraham Lincoln and the War Department which culminated with orders for Rochester to pay an Austrian officer for services rendered while assigned to the staff of Brigadier General Louis Blenker. Rochester held the paymaster-general's position until reaching the mandatory retirement age of 64 in February 1890.

Rochester resided in Washington, D.C. during his retirement, in addition to spending summers at Vineyard Haven, Massachusetts. He was a member of the Loyal Legion and the Sons of the Revolution, in addition to membership in the Metropolitan Club and Chevy Chase Club. He died in Washington on 11 November 1909. Rochester was buried at Arlington National Cemetery.

== Dates of rank ==
Rochester's dates of rank were:

- Major (Union Army), 1 June 1861
- Major (Regular Army), 17 January 1867
- Lieutenant Colonel (Brevet) (Regular Army), 2 March 1867
- Brigadier General (Regular Army), 18 February 1882
- Brigadier General (Retired), 15 February 1890
