= Sarah Dolley =

American physician (1829–1909)

Sarah Read Dolley
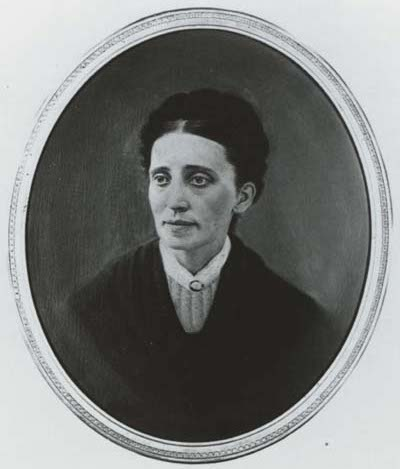
- Born: 11 March 1829; Schuylkill Township, Chester County, Pennsylvania
- Died: 27 December 1909 (aged 80); Rochester, New York, US
- Education: Central Medical College (M.D.)
- Spouse: Dr. Lester Dolley
- Scientific career
- Fields: Medicine
- Workplaces: Woman's Medical College of Pennsylvania

Sarah Dolley (March 11, 1829 – December 27, 1909) was an American physician who became one of the first women in the United States to earn a medical degree and the first woman to complete a medical internship, at Blockley Almshouse. She ran a private practice in Rochester, New York, and briefly taught obstetrics at the Woman's Medical College of Pennsylvania.

== Early life and education ==
Sarah Read Adamson was born in Schuylkill Township, Chester County, Pennsylvania, on 11 March 1829. She attended a Quaker school in Philadelphia as a child. Her uncle, Dr. Hiram Corson, initially opposed her desire to become a doctor, but eventually agreed to tutor her and later allowed her to study in his office before applying to medical school. After being denied entry to many medical colleges, Dolley became one of four women admitted to the Central Medical College, in Rochester, New York, and earned her M.D. in 1851. She became the first woman intern in the United States at Blockley Almshouse in Philadelphia, completing a one-year internship. In 1852, she married Dr. Lester Dolley, a professor at Central Medical College, and returned to Rochester where they ran a private practice together until her husband's death in 1872. She attended clinics in the Necker–Enfants Malades Hospital in Paris from 1869 to 1870 and clinics in Prague and Vienna in 1875.

== Career ==
Dolley temporarily worked as a professor of obstetrics from 1873 to 1874 at the Woman's Medical College of Pennsylvania in Philadelphia, before returning to private practice in Rochester. She made efforts to help women get hired in hospital positions that they could not previously obtain, knowing how much she had benefited from the experiences of her internship. In 1886 she was one of a group of women who founded a clinic for the medical and surgical care of underprivileged women and children, naming it the Provident Dispensary Association, and Dolley became its first president. The same group also founded the Practitioners Society, which in 1906 was renamed the Blackwell Society. The Women's Medical Society of the State of New York was launched by the Blackwell Society, also with Dolley as the president. She helped to organize a chapter of the Women's Educational and Industrial Union in 1893. Dolley also worked to help her community, co-founding the Rochester chapter of the American Red Cross. She was politically active in advocating for women's suffrage, and in the 1872 presidential election attempted to register and vote. She had a reputation in the community of being a skilled doctor, even among her male colleagues, which was unusual of a woman physician in the nineteenth-century United States.

== Private life and death ==
Dolley and her husband had two children together, Loilyn and Charles Sumner, although only her son survived to adulthood, as Loilyn died of pneumonia at the age of 4.

Dolley died on 27 December 1909. She is buried at Mount Hope Cemetery in Rochester, New York.
