= Alfred Ely =

American politician

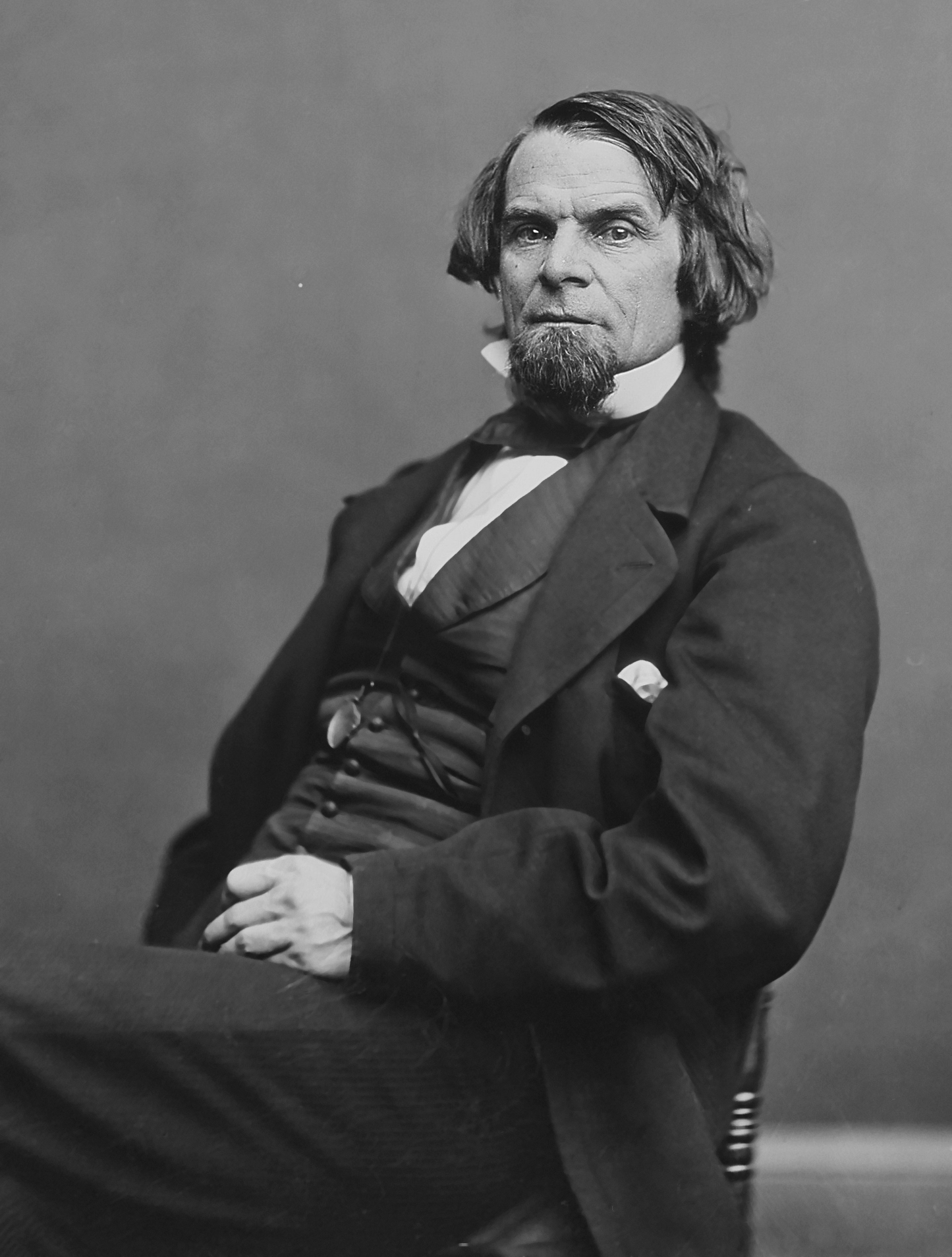

Member of the U.S. House of Representatives from New York's 29th district
- In office March 4, 1859 – March 3, 1863
- Preceded by: Samuel George Andrews
- Succeeded by: Augustus Frank

Personal details
- Born: February 15, 1815 Lyme, Connecticut, US
- Died: May 18, 1892 (aged 77) Rochester, New York, US
- Resting place: Mount Hope Cemetery; Rochester, New York
- Party: Republican

Alfred Ely (February 15, 1815 – May 18, 1892) was a U.S. representative from New York. He was elected as a Republican to the Thirty-sixth and Thirty-seventh Congresses (March 4, 1859 – March 3, 1863), serving New York's 29th congressional district. Ely was captured by Confederate forces while spectating at the First Battle of Bull Run.

== Early life and political career ==
Born in Lyme, Connecticut, Ely attended the common schools and Bacon Academy at Colchester, Connecticut. He moved to Rochester, New York, in 1835. He studied law and was admitted to the bar in 1841. Ely commenced practice in Rochester.

Ely was elected as a Republican to the Thirty-sixth and Thirty-seventh Congresses (March 4, 1859 – March 3, 1863). He served as chairman of the Committee on Invalid Pensions for the Thirty-seventh Congress. He was not a candidate for renomination in 1862.

== Civil war ==
While witnessing the First Battle of Bull Run, Congressman Ely was taken a prisoner by the Confederates and imprisoned in Libby Prison of Richmond, Virginia; he was there for nearly six months along with many others. Among those captured was William H. Upham, the future 18th Governor of Wisconsin who was a private in the Belle City Rifles of the 2nd Wisconsin Volunteer Infantry Regiment.

In December 1861, Ely was exchanged for Charles J. Faulkner, by the latter's own negotiations. At 5:00 AM on Christmas Day Ely was set free from Libby Prison. After Ely's release, D. Appleton & Company of New York published a journal of his experience in Libby Prison in 1862. Thereafter, he resumed the practice of law. He died in Rochester, New York, May 18, 1892. He was interred in the Ely vault in Mount Hope Cemetery.

== See also ==
U.S. House of Representatives
Preceded by Samuel George Andrews	Member of the U.S. House of Representatives from New York's 29th congressional district 1859–1863	Succeeded by Augustus Frank
