= Mount Hope Cemetery (Rochester) =

Historic cemetery in Monroe County, New York state

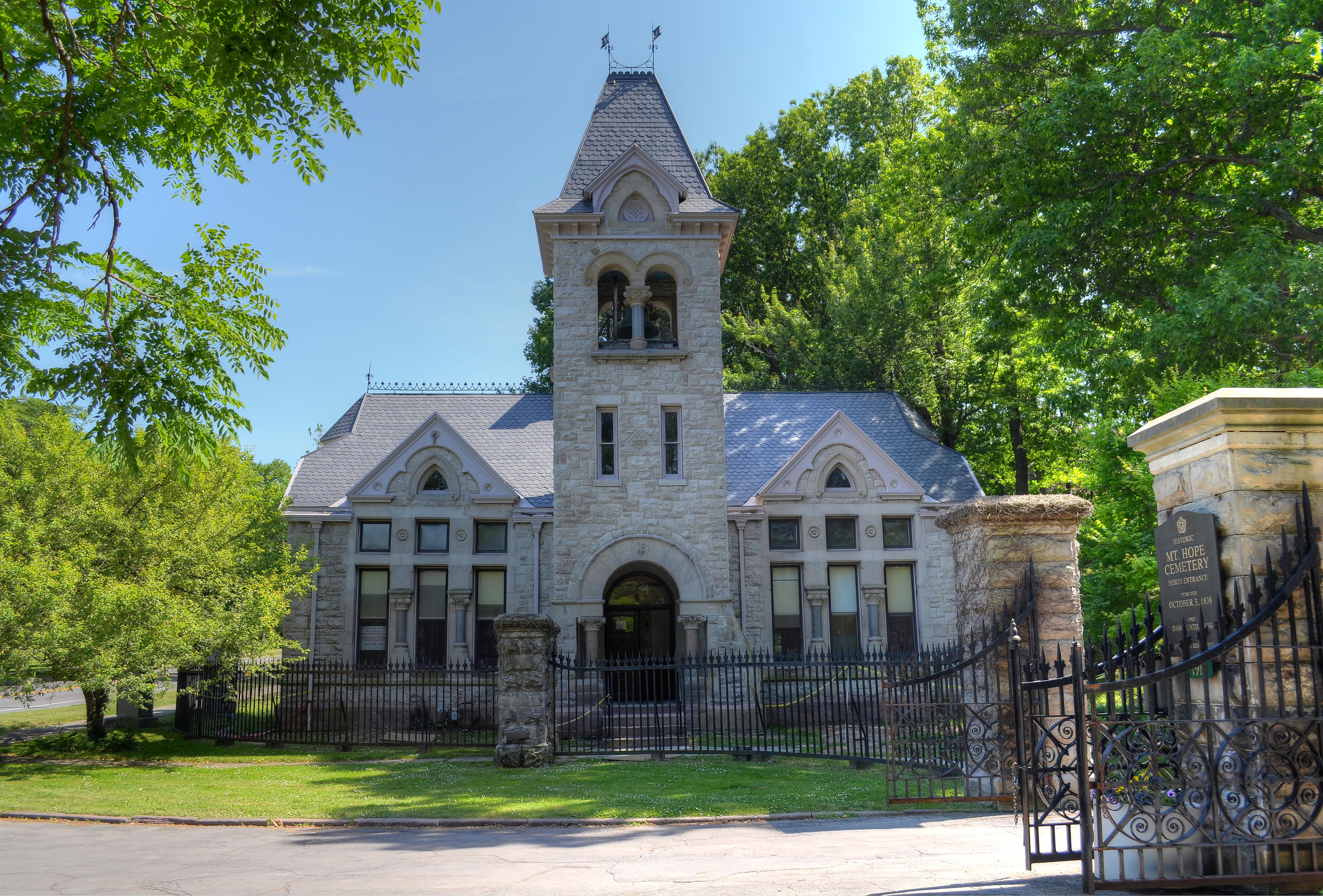
- Gate House of Mount Hope Cemetery
- Interactive map of Mount Hope Cemetery

Details
- Established: 1838
- Location: Rochester, New York
- Country: United States
- Coordinates: 43°07′40″N 77°36′59″W
- Type: Public
- Owned by: City of Rochester
- Size: 196 acres (79 ha)
- No. of graves: 350,000
- Website: Official website
- Find a Grave: Mount Hope Cemetery
- The Political Graveyard: Mount Hope Cemetery
- Mount Hope Cemetery
- U.S. National Register of Historic Places
- NRHP reference No.: 100002361
- Added to NRHP: April 30, 2018

Mount Hope Cemetery is a municipal cemetery in Rochester, New York, United States. Founded in 1838, it is the burial site of Susan B. Anthony and Frederick Douglass. Situated on 196 acres (79 ha) of land adjacent to the University of Rochester on Mount Hope Avenue, the cemetery is the permanent resting place of over 350,000 people. The annual growth rate of this cemetery is 500–600 burials per year.

The cemetery hosts the sculpture Defenders of the Flag, a Civil War monument made in 1908 by the American sculptor Sally James Farnham. In 2018 it was listed on the National Register of Historic Places.

== Geology of Mount Hope ==
About 12,000 to 14,000 years ago, Mount Hope was covered with ice one to two miles thick. As the glacier receded, cracks appeared in the ice, and these crevasses became rivers of water and gravel. When the miles-high ice sheets finally melted, these river beds were left as ridges created from all the rock and rubble that had been deposited by the flowing river. In geological terms, these ridges are called eskers. One such esker snakes its way through much of Mount Hope Cemetery.

== Notable structures and events ==
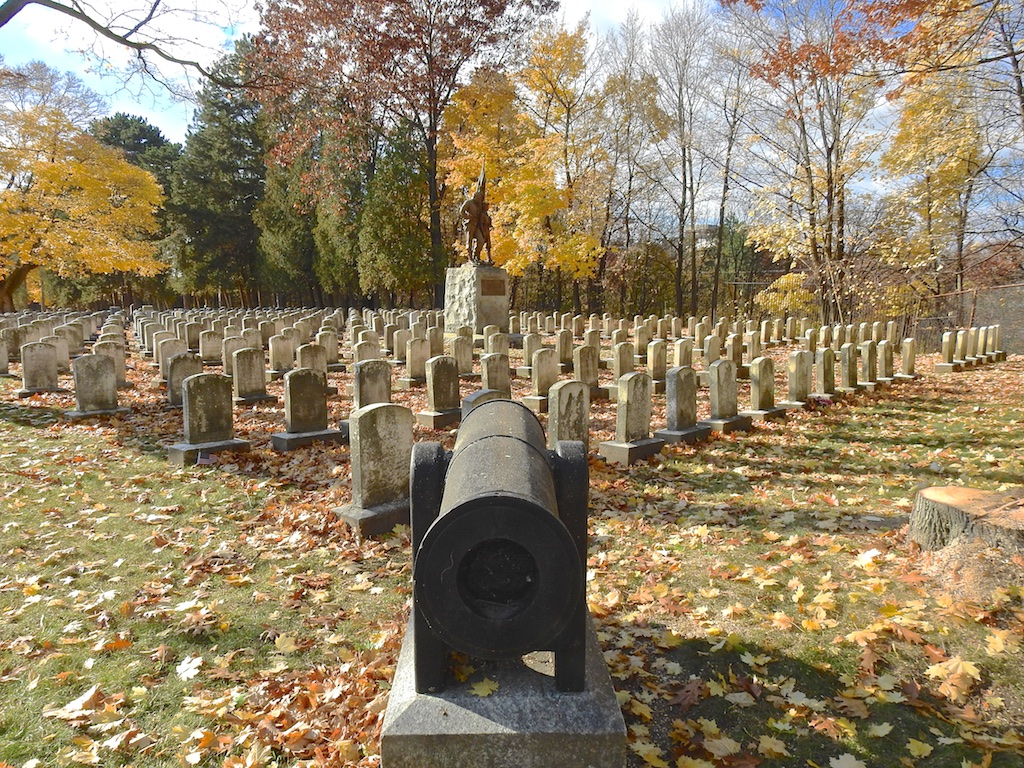
Sally (Sara) James Farnham sculpture, Defenders of the Flag, in Mount Hope Cemetery in Rochester, New York

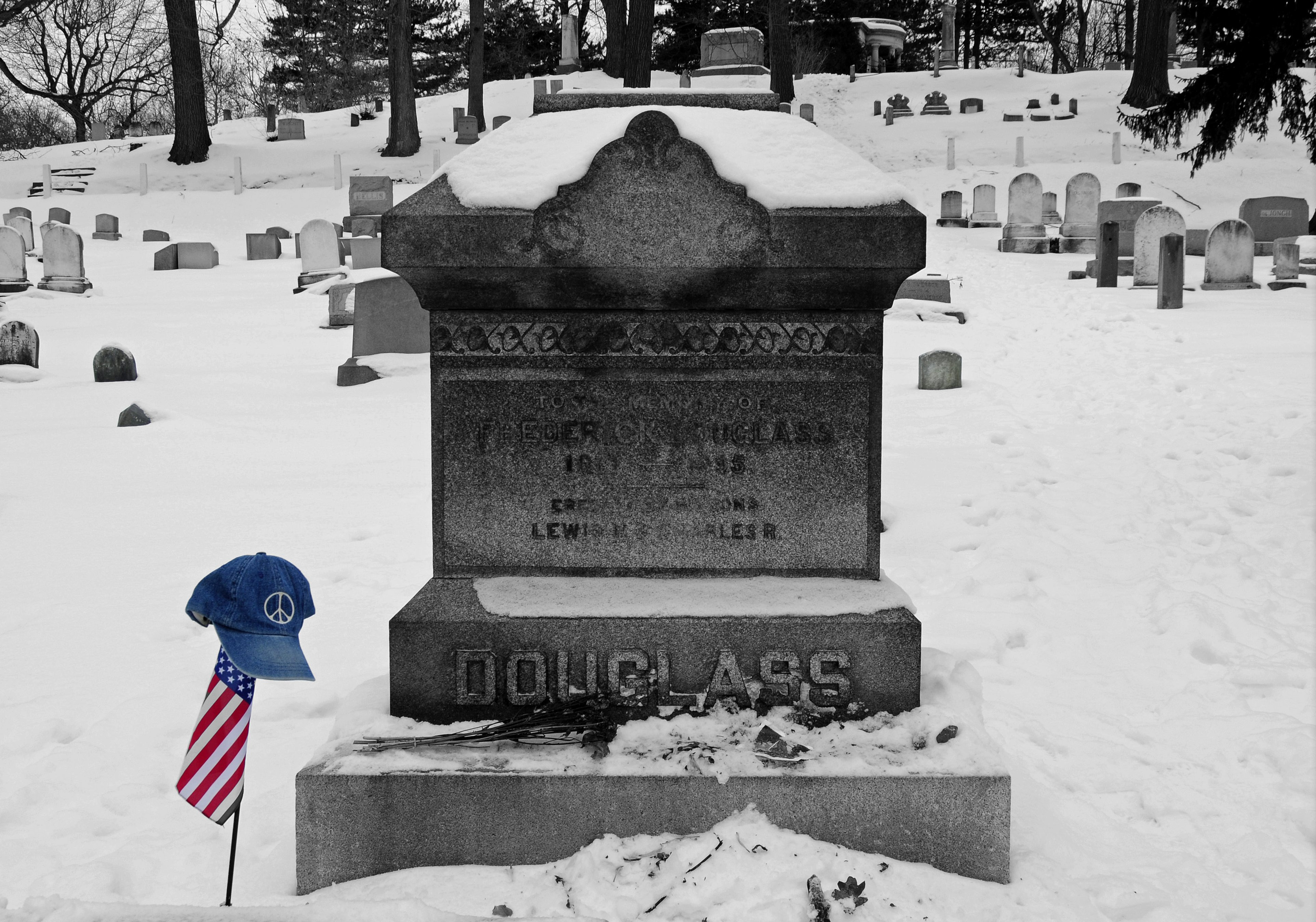
The gravestone of Frederick Douglass at Mount Hope

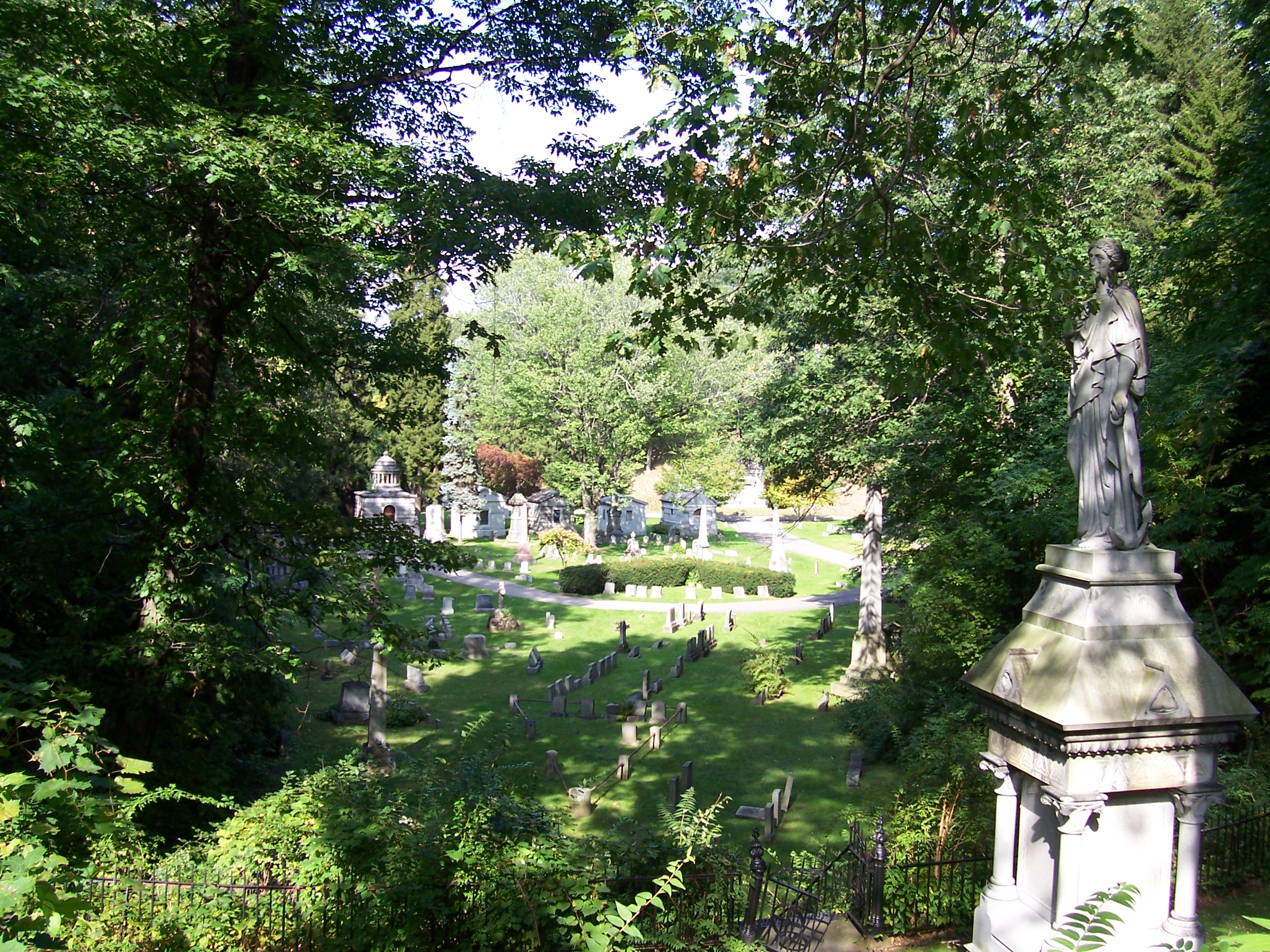
View of grave markers in Section L

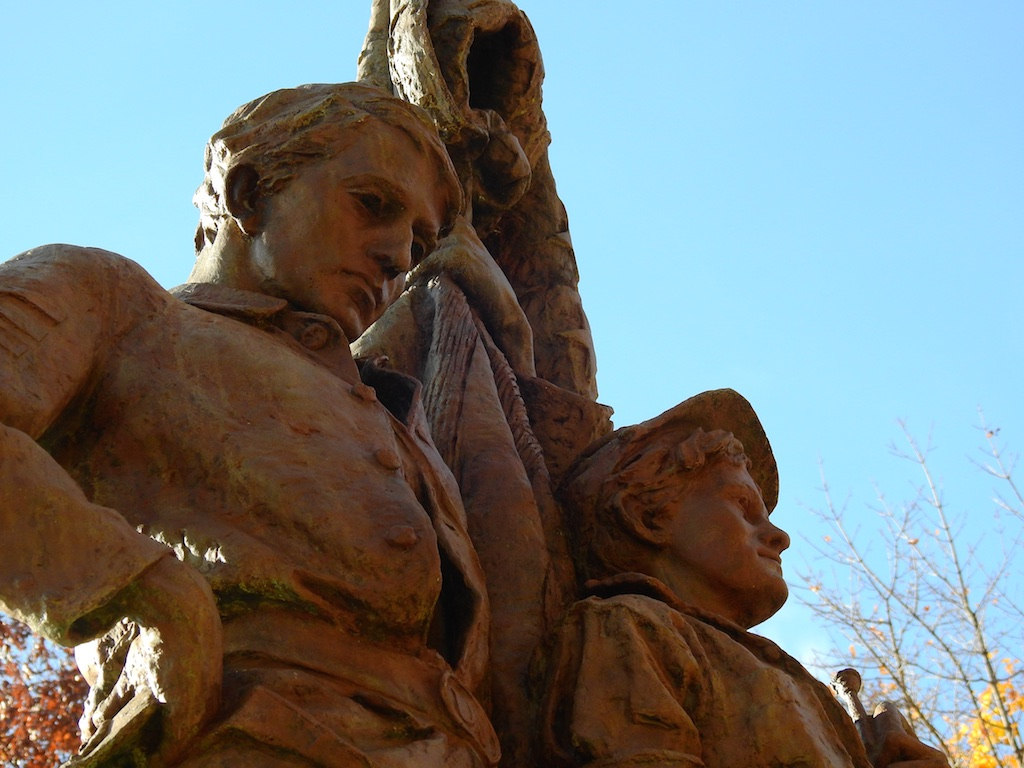
Detail of the Civil War monument

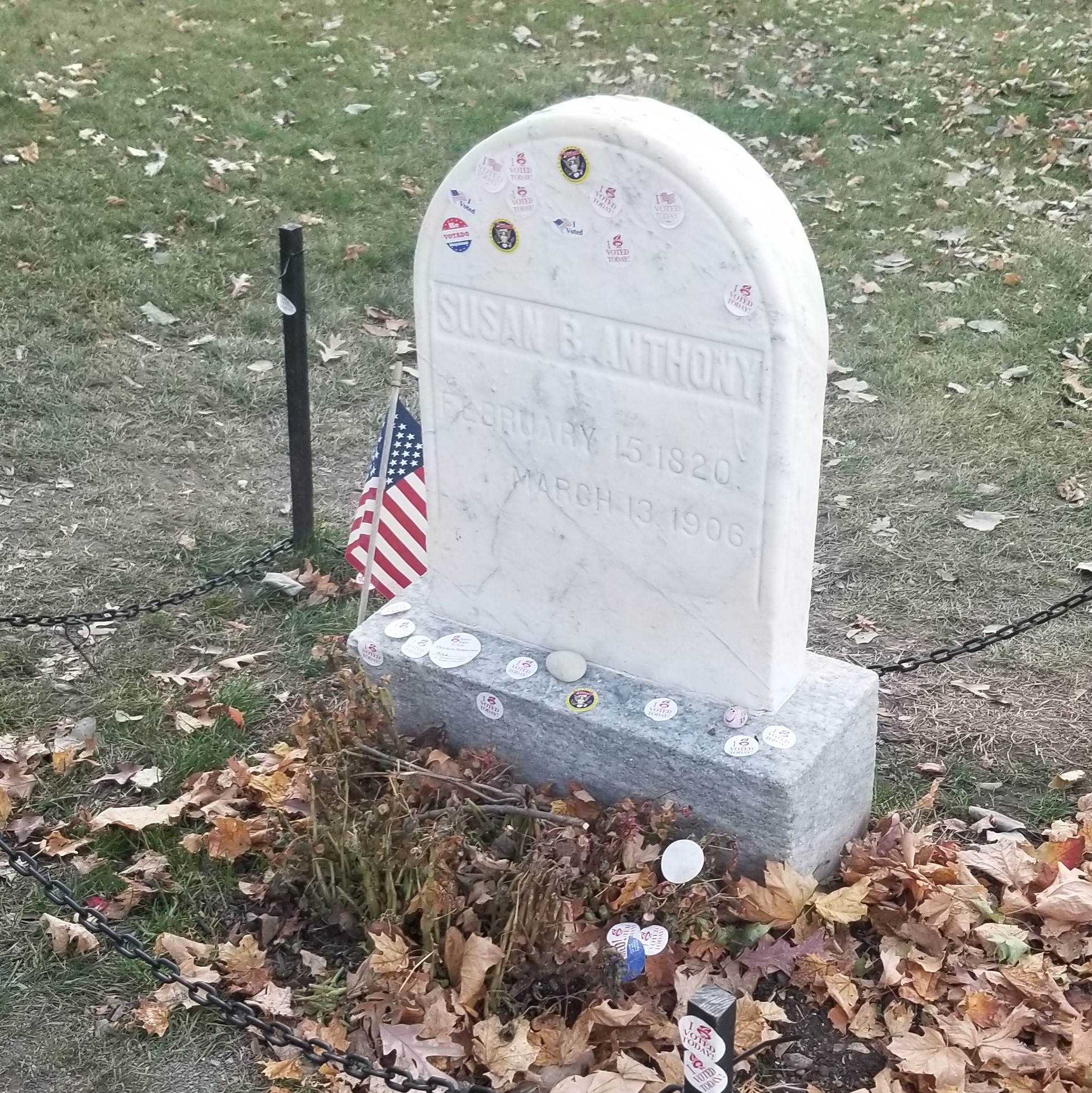
The gravestone of Susan B. Anthony with "I Voted" stickers on and around the gravesite

Mount Hope Cemetery was once the site of "The Fandango Tower." This was a wooden structure, sitting atop the highest elevation of the cemetery, acting as an observation tower. This offered visitors grand views of the city, as well as the meandering Genesee River. The Fandango was involved in the "Great Rochester Mirage" of April 1871. Visitors to the tower noted on the morning of April 16, 1871, that views of the Canadian banks of Lake Ontario could be seen from the tower in great detail, as if replacing those of Rochester. These views of Canada's lake shores, over 50 miles away, were indeed visible from The Fandango Tower, due to an atmospheric phenomena known as Fata Morgana. The Fandango Tower is no more, however the ruined foundations can still be found in one of the deep kettles of the cemetery to this day.

The architectural styles of the cemetery's gravestone and grave markers, crypts, chapels, gatehouses, and mausoleums span three centuries. Distinct motifs of the High Victorian Gothic and Neoclassical architectural traditions persist throughout the cemetery and its various structures. Tiffany glass windows may be found in several of the mausoleums.

The cemetery contains two non-denominational chapels which the Friends group refers to by their construction dates: the 1862 Chapel and the 1912 Chapel. Neither has been used for decades and are closed to the public due to their structural deterioration although in 2020 a local contractor completed masonry stabilitzation work on the 1912 chapel.

The cemetery is home to several working water features. Sylvan Waters, a water feature constructed within a naturally forming kettle pond, was remodeled and brought back into use during the Fall-Winter season of 2016 and 2017.

In June 2000, American Civil War General Elisha Marshall's crypt was desecrated and vandalized, resulting in his remains being scattered throughout the surrounding area. Marshall's bodily remains were gathered and reinterred, however, the whereabouts of the skull remains a mystery. The perpetrators were never apprehended or identified.

For years it has been a tradition during elections for people, mostly women, to place "I Voted" stickers on the gravestone of Women's rights activist, Susan B. Anthony. In 2016, 10,000 people were estimated to visit the gravesite during the notable election of having the first woman, Hillary Clinton, running for president on a major party ticket. The headstone was damaged by the residue left by the stickers. As a result, in anticipation of visitors for the 2020 election, Friends of Mount Hope Cemetery placed a clear Plexiglass sleeve to protect the site from further damage.

== Notable burials ==
- Samuel G. Andrews
- Susan B. Anthony
- Charles S. Baker
- John Jacob Bausch
- Jessie Bonstelle
- Azariah Boody
- Henry Colvin Brewster
- Anita Bush
- Warren Carman
- Hartwell Carver
- Graham H Chapin
- Jonathan Child
- Freeman Clarke
- Emma Lampert Cooper
- Adelaide Crapsey
- Algernon Crapsey
- Sarah Dolley
- Anna Murray Douglass
- Frederick Douglass
- Helen Pitts Douglass
- Thomas B. Dunn
- Alfred Ely
- George Ellwanger
- Frank Gannett
- Malcolm Glazer
- Morton Goldberg
- Seth Green
- James Hard
- Myron Holley
- Rev. Thomas James
- Thomas Kempshall
- Alexander B. Lamberton
- Henry Lomb
- General E.G. Marshall
- Vincent Mathews
- Lewis Henry Morgan
- Henry O'Reilly
- Jane Marsh Parker
- Amy and Isaac Post
- Charles Mulford Robinson
- Nathaniel Rochester
- Thomas H. Rochester
- Adolph J. Rodenbeck
- Abraham M. Schermerhorn
- George B. Selden
- Henry R. Selden
- Hiram Sibley
- Elijah F. Smith
- Lucy J. Sprague
- Fletcher Steele
- Margaret Woodbury Strong
- Theron R. Strong
- Samuel R. Thayer
- Bill Todman
- Lillian Wald
- Henry Augustus Ward
- William Warfield
- Don Alonzo Watson
- Jessica M. Weis
- George Whipple
- Frederick Whittlesey
- Abel Carter Wilder

General Elwell Stephen Otis was originally interred at Mount Hope before being removed to Arlington National Cemetery. Notable cremations at Mount Hope include Blanche Stuart Scott and George Eastman.

Elizabeth Mackenzie, mother of Upper Canada Rebellion leader and first Mayor of Toronto, William Lyon MacKenzie, is interred here following her death in exile in 1839 and listed as Elizabeth Kenzie. Her son viewed her passing funeral from his cell at Monroe County Jail in December 1839 after failing to be granted leave to be at her deathbed. The Mackenzie family remained in the United States before returning to Canada in 1849.

== Friends of Mount Hope ==
The Friends of Mount Hope Cemetery is a non-profit organization of volunteers founded in 1980 to restore, preserve, and encourage public use and enjoyment of this unique historical treasure.

== See also ==
- National Register of Historic Places listings in Rochester, New York
- Votes For Women History Trail
