= Warren Carman =

- Born: March 16, 1845; England
- Died: October 17, 1894 (aged 49); New York
- Military career
- Allegiance: United States of America
- Branch: United States Army
- Rank: Private
- Unit: (New York (state)) 1st Regiment New York Volunteer Cavalry - Company H
- Conflicts: Battle of Waynesboro
- Awards: Medal of Honor

Private Warren Carman (March 16, 1845 – October 17, 1894) was an English soldier who fought in the American Civil War. Carman received the United States' highest award for bravery during combat, the Medal of Honor, for his action during the Battle of Waynesboro in Virginia on 2 March 1865. He was honored with the award on 26 March 1865.

== Biography ==
Carman was born in England on 16 March 1845. He enlisted into the 1st New York (Lincoln) Cavalry. He died on 17 October 1894, and his remains are interred at the Mount Hope Cemetery in Rochester, New York.

== Medal of Honor citation ==
Capture of flag and several prisoners.

== See also ==
- List of American Civil War Medal of Honor recipients: A–F
