= Charles H. Clark =

American politician (1818–1873)

Mayor of Rochester, New York
- In office 1858–1859
- Preceded by: Rufus Keeler
- Succeeded by: Samuel W. D. Moore

Personal details
- Born: Charles Henry Clark; June 11, 1818; Saybrook, Connecticut, U.S.
- Died: November 20, 1873 (aged 55); Rochester, New York, U.S.
- Spouse: Maria B. Viele (m. 1848)
- Education: Yale College
- Occupation: Lawyer; politician

Charles Henry Clark (June 11, 1818 – November 20, 1873) was the mayor of Rochester, New York from 1858 to 1859.

== Early life ==
Charles Henry Clark was born on June 11, 1818, in Saybrook, Connecticut. He graduated from Yale College in 1841. Following graduation, Clark taught at an academy in Clinton, Connecticut, for a year. He then studied law in Saybrook and then in Rochester, New York. He was admitted to the bar in October 1845.

== Career ==
Clark practiced law in Rochester. In 1858, he was mayor of Rochester.

In June 1863, Clark was appointed colonel of the 54th Regiment of the New York State National Guard. He was later made brigadier general of the regiment. In April 1873, a court martial was held relating to the "furnishing of headquarters at the arsenal". By October 1873, he was no longer brigadier general. In October 1873, he was accused of forging bank notes, but no legal action was taken due to his health.

== Personal life ==
Clark married Maria B. Viele of Saratoga County, New York, on March 8, 1848. They had at least two sons.

Clark had heart disease and brain disease. He died on November 20, 1870, at his home on North Street in Rochester.
