= Samuel B. Dicker =

American politician (1889–1960)

58th Mayor of Rochester
- In office 1939–1955
- Preceded by: Lester B. Rapp
- Succeeded by: Peter Barry

Personal details
- Born: April 4, 1889 New York City
- Died: February 9, 1960 (aged 70)
- Party: Republican
- Education: Cornell University

Samuel Byron Dicker (April 4, 1889 – February 9, 1960) was an American lawyer and statistician and the 58th Mayor of Rochester from 1939 to 1955.

He was also a director of the Rochester and Genesee Valley Railroad.

Political offices
Preceded by Lester B. Rapp	Mayor of Rochester, NY; 1939–1955	Succeeded by Peter Barry
