= William Woods (New York politician) =

American politician (1790–1837)

Member of the U.S. House of Representatives from New York's 28th district
- In office November 3, 1823 – March 4, 1825
- Preceded by: William B. Rochester
- Succeeded by: Timothy H. Porter

Member of the New York State Assembly
- In office 1828
- In office 1823

Personal details
- Born: November 1790 Washington County, New York, U.S.
- Died: August 7, 1837 (aged 46) Bath, New York, U.S.
- Resting place: Grove Cemetery, Bath, New York, U.S.
- Party: Democratic-Republican
- Profession: Politician, lawyer

William Woods (November 1790 Washington County, New York – August 7, 1837 Bath, Steuben County, New York) was an American lawyer and politician from New York.

== Life ==
He received limited schooling, and removed to Bath in 1813. Then he studied law, was admitted to the bar and practiced in Bath. He was a member of the New York State Assembly in 1823 and 1828.

Woods was elected as an Adams-Clay Democratic-Republican to the 18th United States Congress to fill the vacancy caused by the resignation of William B. Rochester and served from December 1, 1823, to March 3, 1825. Afterwards he resumed the practice of law. He was Surrogate of Steuben County from 1827 to 1835.

He was buried at the Grove Cemetery in Bath.

U.S. House of Representatives
Preceded by William B. Rochester	Member of the U.S. House of Representatives from New York's 28th congressional district 1823–1825	Succeeded by Timothy H. Porter
