= 1826 New York gubernatorial election =

- November 6, 1826
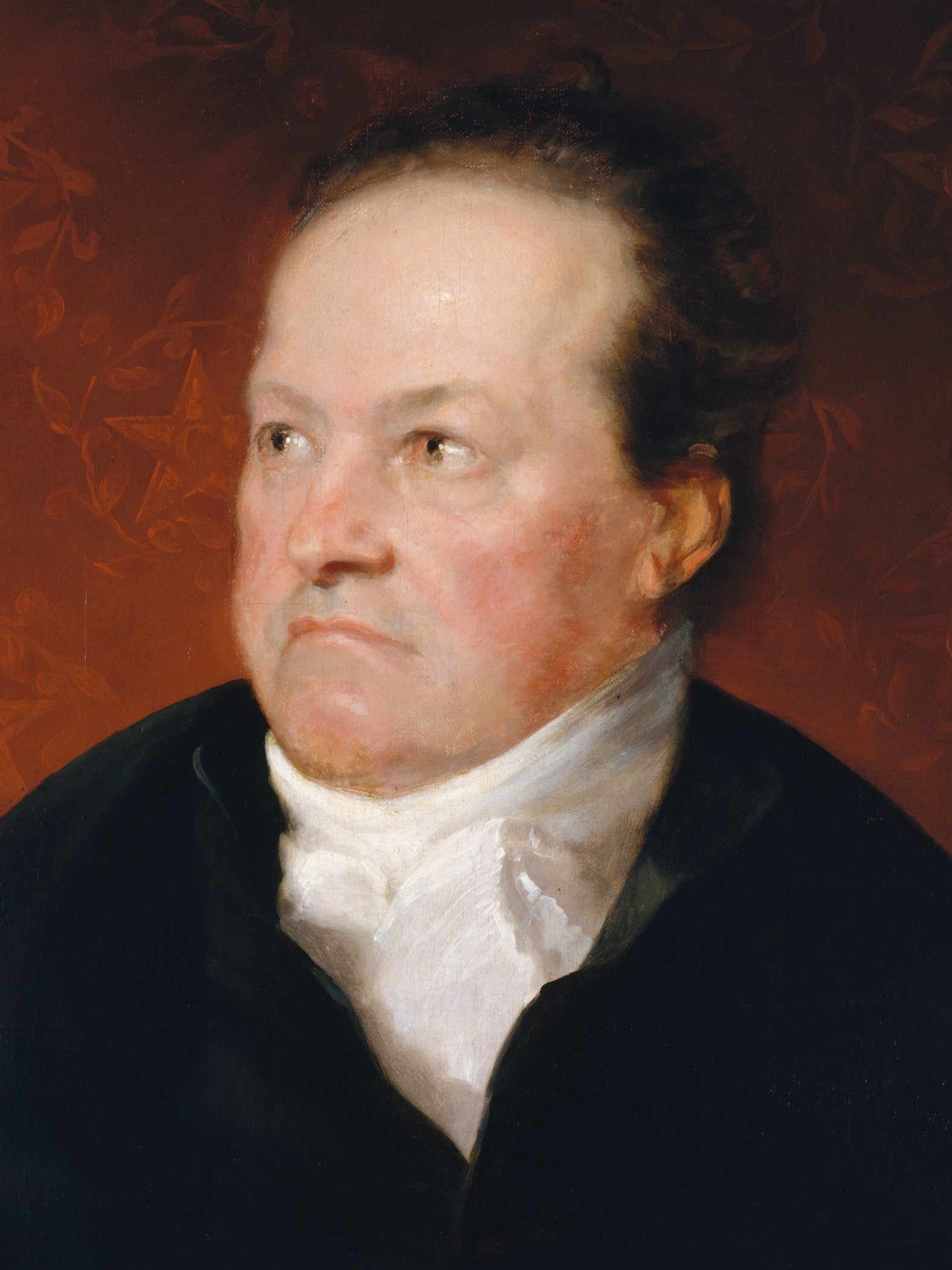

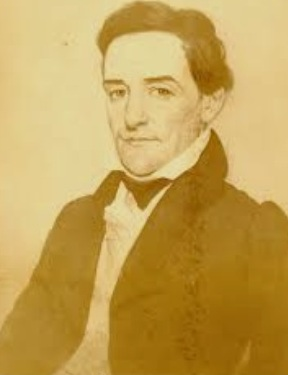
Nominee	DeWitt Clinton	William B. Rochester
Party	Democratic-Republican	Democratic-Republican
Alliance	Clintonian	anti-Clintonian
Popular vote	99,785	96,135
Percentage	50.93%	49.07%
- County results Clinton: 50–60% 60–70% Rochester: 50–60% 60–70%
Governor before election
DeWitt Clinton
Democratic-Republican
Elected Governor
DeWitt Clinton
Democratic-Republican

The 1826 New York gubernatorial election was held from November 6 to 8, 1826. Incumbent governor DeWitt Clinton was elected to a second consecutive and fourth overall term in office, defeating former U.S. Representative William B. Rochester.

== General election ==
=== Candidates ===
- DeWitt Clinton, incumbent Governor since 1825 and former U.S. Senator and mayor of New York City (Clintonian Republican)
- William B. Rochester, former U.S. Representative from Bath and judge of the Eighth Circuit Court of New York (anti-Clintonian Republican)

The Clintonian faction of the Democratic-Republican Party nominated incumbent DeWitt Clinton. The anti-Clintonian faction nominated former U.S. representative and Judge of the Eighth Circuit Court William B. Rochester.

=== Results ===
Incumbent governor DeWitt Clinton was elected to a second term as governor, and Nathaniel Pitcher, the candidate of the anti-Clintonian faction, was elected lieutenant governor.

1826 New York gubernatorial election
Party	Candidate	Votes	%	±%
Democratic-Republican (Clintonian)	DeWitt Clinton (incumbent)	99,785	50.93%	-3.36%
Democratic-Republican (anti-Clintonian)	William B. Rochester	96,135	49.07%	+3.36%
Total votes		195,920	100%	

==== Results by county ====
Results by county
County	DeWitt Clinton		William B. Rochester		Total
County	Votes	%	Votes	%	Total
Albany	2,980	54.11%	2,527	45.89%	5,507
Allegany	1,270	43.36%	1,659	56.64%	2,929
Broome	1,087	63.12%	635	36.88%	1,722
Cattaraugus	784	46.83%	890	53.17%	1,674
Cayuga	3,042	48.66%	3,209	51.34%	6,251
Chautauqua	1,839	53.29%	1,612	46.71%	3,451
Chenango	2,504	51.98%	2,313	48.02%	4,817
Clinton	818	44.48%	1,021	55.52%	1,839
Columbia	2,552	51.43%	2,410	48.57%	4,962
Cortland	1,364	49.46%	1,394	50.54%	2,758
Delaware	1,609	42.36%	2,189	57.64%	3,798
Dutchess	3,284	51.03%	3,151	48.97%	6,435
Erie	2,186	60.29%	1,440	39.71%	3,626
Essex	1,184	55.02%	968	44.98%	2,152
Franklin	690	56.79%	525	43.21%	1,215
Genessee	2,923	52.05%	2,693	47.95%	5,616
Greene	1,456	44.64%	1,806	55.36%	3,262
Herkimer	2,094	45.84%	2,474	54.16%	4,568
Jefferson	2,900	49.98%	2,902	50.02%	5,802
Kings	677	54.51%	565	45.49%	1,242
Lewis	736	50.27%	728	49.73%	1,464
Livingston	1,749	52.30%	1,595	47.70%	3,344
Madison	2,268	48.37%	2,421	51.63%	4,689
Monroe	2,544	49.43%	2,603	50.57%	5,147
Montgomery and Hamilton (Note: Results for Montgomery and Hamilton counties were reported together in the source material)	3,011	53.32%	2,636	46.68%	5,647
New York	5,619	56.51%	4,324	43.49%	9,943
Niagara	836	44.66%	1,036	55.34%	1,872
Oneida	4,180	57.64%	3,072	42.36%	7,252
Nondaga	3,210	47.79%	3,507	52.21%	6,717
Ontario	2,605	62.79%	1,544	37.21%	4,149
Orange	1,892	44.12%	2,396	55.88%	4,288
Orleans	884	48.33%	945	51.67%	1,829
Oswego	1,235	46.50%	1,421	53.50%	2,656
Otsego	2,658	49.65%	2,696	50.35%	5,354
Putnam	490	34.58%	927	65.42%	1,417
Queens	910	67.66%	435	32.34%	1,345
Rensselaer	3,488	53.59%	3,021	46.41%	6,509
Richmond	347	47.02%	391	52.98%	738
Rockland	345	40.40%	509	59.60%	854
Saratoga	2,463	48.50%	2,615	51.50%	5,078
Schenectady	752	43.37%	982	56.63%	1,734
Schoharie	1,311	39.81%	1,982	60.19%	3,293
Seneca	1,064	45.94%	1,252	54.06%	2,316
St. Lawrence	1,761	56.84%	1,337	43.16%	3,098
Steuben	2,139	57.52%	1,580	42.48%	3,719
Suffolk	817	51.00%	785	49.00%	1,602
Sullivan	746	50.68%	726	49.32%	1,472
Tioga	1,445	50.63%	1,409	49.37%	2,854
Tompkins	1,588	42.71%	2,130	57.29%	3,718
Ulster	2,107	54.22%	1,779	45.78%	3,886
Warren	576	39.05%	899	60.95%	1,475
Washington	2,891	58.29%	2,069	41.71%	4,960
Wayne	1,402	53.19%	1,234	46.81%	2,636
Westchester	1,626	54.00%	1,385	46.00%	3,011
Yates	847	38.02%	1,381	61.98%	2,228
Total	99,785	50.93%	96,135	49.07%	195,920
