= List of mayors of Rochester, New York =

Mayor of Rochester
- Seal of the City of Rochester

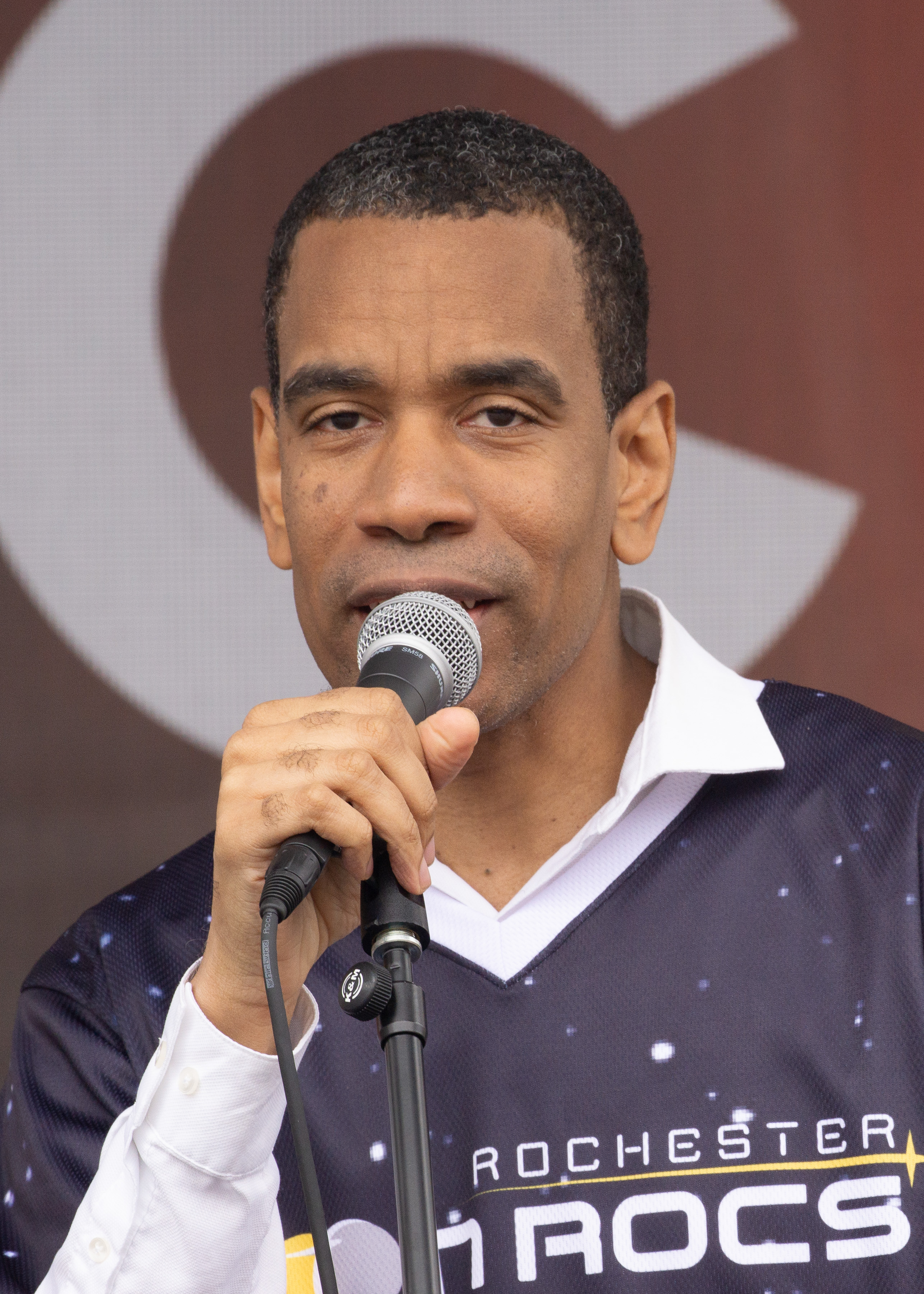
- Incumbent; Malik Evans since January 1, 2022
- Style: The Honorable
- Term length: Four years; renewable
- Inaugural holder: Jonathan Child
- Formation: 1834
- Salary: $143,000 (2017)
- Website: Office website

The following is the complete list of the mayors of the city of Rochester, New York.

Rochester's city charter defines the mayor as the chief executive of the city, empowered to enforce all local laws and make appointments to all appointed local offices.

When Rochester was incorporated in 1834, the mayor was initially appointed by the city council and had few responsibilities beyond presiding over council meetings. In 1840, the New York state legislature passed a law making the mayors of all incorporated cities elective. Various amendments to the city charter during the 19th century gave the mayor additional powers of appointment. In 1898, the state legislature adopted a uniform charter for all cities, establishing a mayor-council government where the mayor controlled all executive functions and appointments. In 1925, Rochester modified its charter in a referendum to switch to a council-manager government, where the mayor was ceremonial and executive functions were handled by a city manager appointed by the council. A second referendum in 1984 changed the city charter back to a mayor-council government.

== List of Mayors of Rochester ==
#	Image	Term	Mayor	Party
1		June 1834 - 1835	Jonathan Child	Whig
2		July 1835 - December 1836	Jacob Gould	Democrat
3		December 1836 - 1837	Abraham M. Schermerhorn	Whig
4		March 1837 - 1838	Thomas Kempshall	Whig
5		1838 - December 1838	Elisha Johnson	Democrat
6		December 1838 - December 1839	Thomas H. Rochester	Whig
7		December 1839 - 1840	Samuel G. Andrews	Whig
8		1840 - 1842	Elijah F. Smith	Whig
9		March 1842 - 1843	Charles J. Hill	Democrat
10		1843 - 1844	Isaac Hills	Democrat
11		March 1844 - March 1845	John Allen	Whig
12		March 1845 - 1847	William Pitkin	Whig
13		1847 - 1848	John B. Elwood	Democrat
14		1848 - 1849	Joseph Field	Democrat
15		March 1849 - 1850	Levi A. Ward	Whig
16		March 1850 - 1851	Samuel Richardson	Democrat
17		1851 - 1852	Nicholas E. Paine	Democrat
18		1852 - 1853	Hamblin Stillwell	Democrat
19		1853 - 1854	John Williams	Democrat
20		1854 - 1855	Maltby Strong	Whig
21		1855 - 1856	Charles J. Hayden	American
22		1856 - 1857	Samuel G. Andrews	Republican
23		1857 - 1858	Rufus Keeler	Democrat
24		1858 - 1859	Charles H. Clark	Democrat
25		1859 - 1860	Samuel W. D. Moore	Republican
26		1860 - 1861	Hamlet D. Scrantom	Republican
27		March 1861 - April 1862	John C. Nash	Republican
28		April 1862 - April 1863	Michael Filon	Democrat
29		April 1863 - March 1864	Nehemiah C. Bradstreet	Democrat
30		March 1864 - March 1865	James Brackett	Democrat
31		March 1865 - 1866	Daniel D. T. Moore	Republican
32		1866 - 1867	Samuel W. D. Moore	Republican
33		March 1867 - 1869	Henry L. Fish	Democrat
34		1869 - 1870	Edward M. Smith	Republican
35		1870 - 1871	John Lutes	Democrat
36		April 1871 - April 1872	Charles W. Briggs	Republican
37		April 1872 - October 28, 1873	Abel Carter Wilder	Republican
38		October 28, 1873 - 1874	George W. Aldridge, Sr. (acting)	Republican
39		1874 - 1876	George G. Clarkson	Republican
40		1876 - 1890	Cornelius R. Parsons	Republican
41		1890 - 1892	William Carroll	Democrat
42		1892 - 1894	Richard J. Curran	Republican
43		April 1, 1894 - January 22, 1895	George W. Aldridge	Republican
44		January 22, 1895 - December 31, 1895	Merton E. Lewis (acting)	Republican
45		January 1, 1896 - December 31, 1899	George E. Warner	Democrat
46		January 1, 1900 - December 31, 1901	George A. Carnahan	Republican
47		January 1, 1902 - December 31, 1903	Adolph J. Rodenbeck	Republican
48		January 1, 1904 - December 31, 1907	James G. Cutler	Republican
49		January 1, 1908 - December 31, 1921	Hiram Edgerton	Republican
50		January 1, 1922 - June 17, 1926	Clarence D. Van Zandt	Republican
51		June 22, 1926 - January 3, 1928	Martin B. O'Neil	Republican
52		January 3, 1928 - March 5, 1930	Joseph C. Wilson	Republican
53		March 5, 1930 - January 2, 1932	Vice Mayor Isaac Adler & City Manager Stephen B. Story (acting)	Republican
54		January 2, 1932 - April 28, 1933	Charles S. Owen	Democrat
55		April 28, 1933 - January 2, 1934	Percival D. Oviatt	Republican
56		January 2, 1934 - December 31, 1937	Charles Stanton	Republican
57		January 1, 1938 - December 31, 1938	Lester B. Rapp	Republican
58		January 10, 1939 - June 14, 1955	Samuel B. Dicker	Republican
59		June 14, 1955 - December 31, 1961	Peter Barry	Republican
60		January 1, 1962 - December 31, 1963	Henry E. Gillette	Democrat
61		January 1, 1964 - December 31, 1969	Frank Lamb	Democrat
62		January 1, 1970 - December 31, 1973	Stephen May	Republican
63		January 1, 1974 - December 31, 1993	Thomas P. Ryan, Jr.	Democrat
64		January 1, 1994 - December 31, 2005	William A. Johnson, Jr.	Democrat
65		January 1, 2006 - December 31, 2010	Robert "Bob" J. Duffy	Democrat
66		January 1, 2011 - January 18, 2011	Thomas S. Richards (interim)	Democrat
67		January 18, 2011 - April 11, 2011	R. Carlos Carballada (interim)	Democrat
68		April 11, 2011 - December 31, 2013	Thomas S. Richards	Democrat
69		January 1, 2014 - December 1, 2021	Lovely Warren	Democrat
70		December 2, 2021 - December 31, 2021	James Smith (interim)	Democrat
71		January 1, 2022 – present	Malik Evans	Democrat
