= Lucy J. Sprague =

African American suffragist

- Born: Lucy Earle; 1851; Rochester, New York, US
- Died: September 29, 1903 (aged 51–52); Rochester, New York, US
- Burial place: Mount Hope Cemetery
- Occupation: Suffragist
- Spouse: James Alfred Sprague

Lucy J. Sprague (born Earle 1851 – September 29, 1903) was an American suffragist from Rochester, New York.

== Biography ==
Sprague was born as Lucy Earle in Rochester, New York, in 1851. Her family were involved in the African Methodist Episcopal Zion Church and Sprague would remain active throughout her life. She was married to James Alfred Sprague in 1878 and they had one surviving son.

In the church, Sprague volunteered in several different roles, including acting as treasurer and superintendent of the Sunday School for infants. She and her husband were both members of the Susan B. Anthony Club for Colored Women and worked towards women's suffrage. Sprague also worked with Hester C. Jeffrey in the church and as an activist.

Sprague died on September 29, 1903, in her home in Rochester. She was buried in Mount Hope Cemetery.
