= Samuel G. Andrews =

American politician

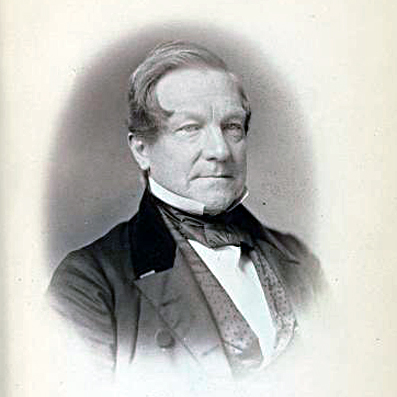

Member of the U.S. House of Representatives from New York's 29th district
- In office March 4, 1857 – March 3, 1859
- Preceded by: John Williams
- Succeeded by: Alfred Ely

22nd Mayor of Rochester, New York
- In office 1856

7th Mayor of Rochester, New York
- In office December 1839–1840

Personal details
- Born: October 16, 1796 Derby, Connecticut
- Died: June 11, 1863 (aged 66) Rochester, New York
- Party: Whig
- Occupation: Politician

Samuel George Andrews (October 16, 1796 – June 11, 1863) was an American businessman and politician who served one term as and a U.S. Representative from New York from 1857 to 1859.

== Early life and education ==
Samuel G. Andrews was born in Derby, Connecticut, on October 16, 1796. As a youth, he attended the public schools and a classical academy in Chester, Connecticut. He moved to New York in 1815 with his parents, who settled in Rochester. Andrews then became engaged in the mercantile business.

== Career ==
His political career began as clerk of the State assembly in 1831 and 1832, then as clerk of Monroe County from 1834 to 1837. He was later a member of the board of aldermen in 1838, then secretary of the State senate in 1840 and 1841. He was also clerk of the court of errors for two years and was appointed postmaster of Rochester on January 8, 1842. He served in that role until his successor was appointed in 1845.

Andrews served twice as mayor of Rochester in 1840 and 1856. He was a New York delegate to the 1856 Republican National Convention.

=== Congress ===
Elected as a Whig (later the Republican Party) to the 35th United States Congress from New York's 29th congressional district, Andrews held office from March 4, 1857, to March 3, 1859.

== Death ==
Andrews died in Rochester on June 11, 1863, at age 66. He is interred in Mount Hope Cemetery in Rochester.
