= Nathaniel Rochester =

American Revolutionary War soldier, land speculator, and slave trader (1752–1831)

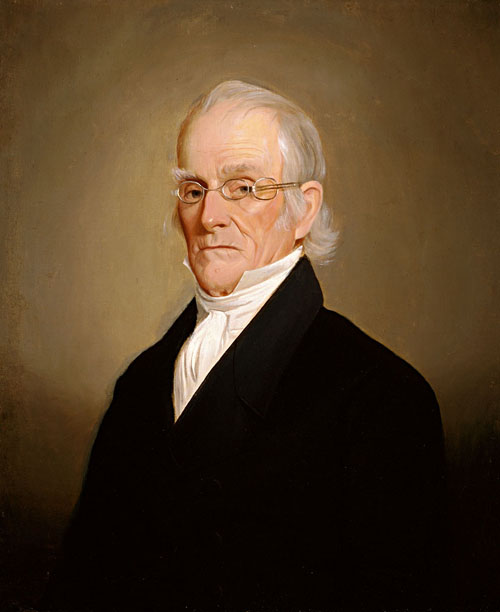
- 1824 portrait

Member of the Maryland General Assembly

Member of the North Carolina General Assembly
- In office 1777–1777

Personal details
- Born: February 21, 1752 Westmoreland County, Virginia
- Died: May 17, 1831 (aged 79) Rochester, New York
- Resting place: Mount Hope Cemetery
- Spouse: Sophia Beatty (m. 1788)
- Children: 12, including William, Thomas

Nathaniel Rochester (February 21, 1752 – May 17, 1831) was an American Revolutionary War soldier and land speculator, most noted for founding the settlement which would become Rochester, New York.

== Early life ==
Nathaniel Rochester was the fifth of six children born to John and Hester Thrift Rochester in Westmoreland County, Virginia on February 21, 1752. His father, who owned Rochester House, died in 1756. Five years later, Hester married Thomas Cricher. Cricher moved the family to Granville County, North Carolina in 1763, where Nathaniel attended the school of the Reverend Henry Pattillo. His grandfather William Rochester emigrated from England to the Americas.

At age 16, Rochester found a job with a local Hillsborough merchant, signing a two-year contract to be paid £5 per year, which after six months was revised to pay him £20 per year. Rochester would eventually become a partner in the business within five years. In his early working years, he also served as a clerk for the vestry of St. Matthew's Parish, as a committee member for a civic organization, and, most notably, as a delegate to North Carolina's first Provincial Congress.

== Career ==
=== Military, politics, and business ===
In 1775, as the Revolution approached, Rochester was named to the Committee of Safety for Orange County. According to Rochester, his duties necessitated him to "promote revolutionary spirit among the people, provide arms and ammunition, make collections for the people of Boston, and prevent the sale of East India teas." On August 20 of that year, he attended the Third Provincial Congress as a representative of Hillsborough. Rochester was appointed a major in the North Carolina militia, and served as justice of the peace and paymaster of the battalion of minutemen in the district of Hillsborough. The following year, he was assigned command of two infantry and one cavalry company. He was tasked with following Colonel James Thackston in pursuit of Tories marching to join the British at Wilmington. En route, his force captured five hundred Tories retreating from the Battle of Moore's Creek Bridge.

In 1776, Rochester represented Orange County in the Fourth Provincial Congress and was elevated to the rank of colonel in the North Carolina Line. Due to illness, however, Rochester was rendered unfit for military duty and had to resign his command. His role in politics was not affected, and in 1777 he was elected to the North Carolina General Assembly, where he served as county clerk. In addition, Rochester was appointed Colonel of the North Carolina militia. Rochester was also made commissioner in charge of building and managing an arms factory and courthouse, and assisted in establishing an academy in the Hillsborough area.

In 1778 Rochester resigned and entered a mercantile venture with Colonel Thomas Hart, a notable and wealthy merchant and land speculator, and James Brown. Rochester began to invest his earnings into real estate, a practice he continued throughout his life. With the British Army's imminent occupation of Hillsborough, Rochester moved to Philadelphia where he was almost immediately stricken with smallpox. After a lengthy recovery, he joined Hart in Hagerstown, Maryland, where the two became partners in a flour mill, a nail and rope factory, a bank, and a farm.

Rochester remained in Maryland for thirty years, where he served one term in the Maryland General Assembly and two years as postmaster. He was elected as a judge in 1797 but resigned, recognizing that he did not have the proper legal training. Rochester served as Washington County's Sheriff from 1804 to 1806, a presidential elector, and vestryman of Saint John's Church. In 1807, Rochester helped found the Hagerstown Bank, serving as its first president.

=== Land speculation ===
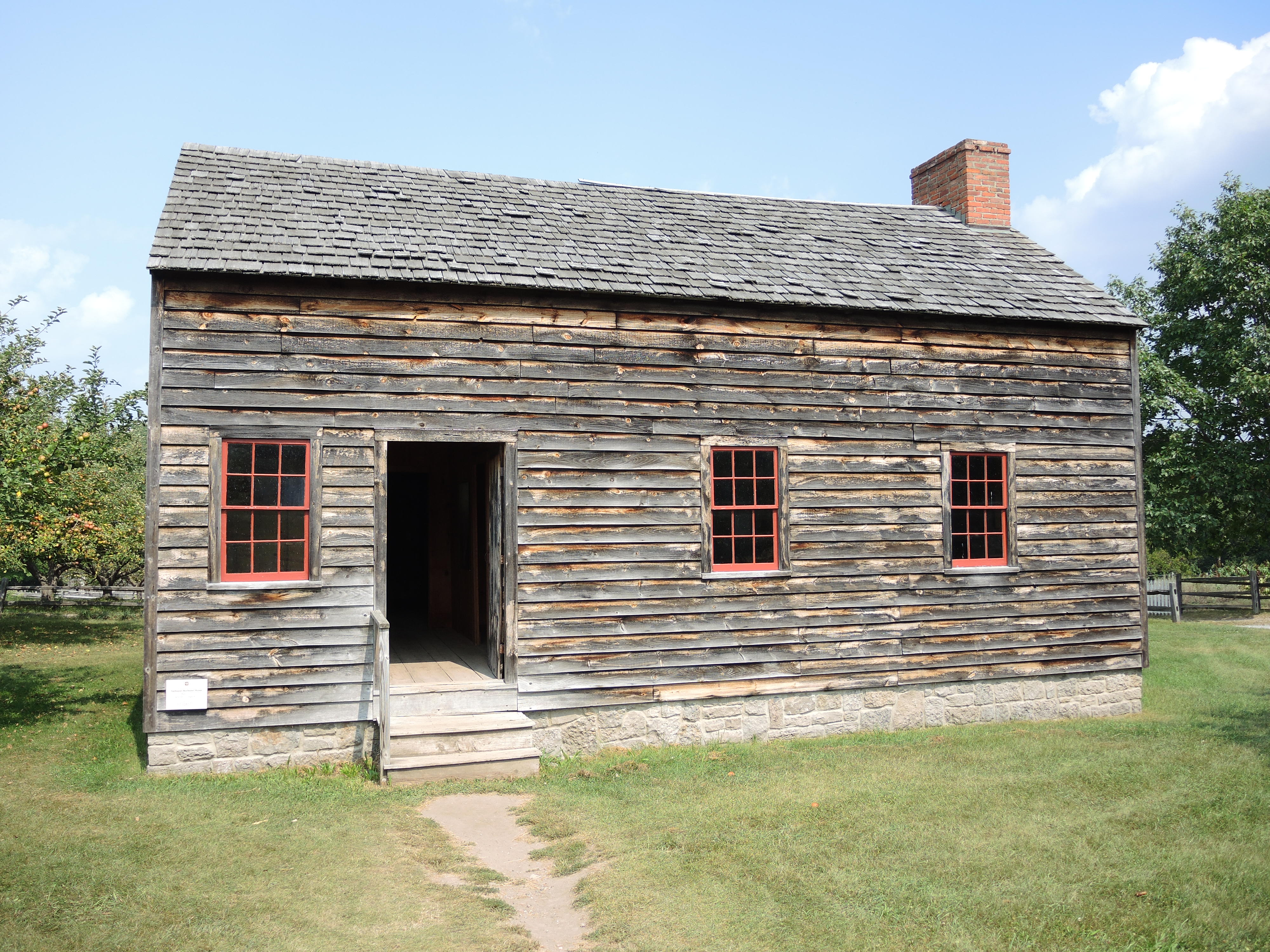
Rochester's house from Dansville, now at the Genesee Country Village and Museum

Two of the directors of the Hagerstown Bank, Colonel William Fitzhugh and Major Charles Carroll were, like Rochester, wealthy landowners interested in acquiring land in the new "frontier" of the U.S. In 1800, Fitzhugh and Carroll convinced Rochester to travel with them on a prospecting visit to the frontier lands of New York, specifically to the lands along the Genesee River. Their first trip took them to Dansville, where Rochester purchased a combined 520 acres, while Fitzhugh and Carroll purchased another 12,000 at $2 per acre.

In November 1803, the three men returned to Geneva to make payments. They were convinced by the land agent to visit the Genesee Falls further north, where they found an abandoned grist and saw mill—opened in 1789—once owned by Ebenezer “Indian” Allen. The men recognized a business opportunity as products traveling upriver toward Lake Ontario would need to be unloaded at the saw mill, and portage fees could be charged. On November 8, 1803, the three men signed a purchase agreement for a 100 acres (0.40 km^{2}) tract near the river's Upper Falls. The final payment of $1,750 (~$35,273 in 2025) was made on June 22, 1808.

=== Life on the Genesee ===
Rochester's interest in the land he now owned along the Genesee prompted him to relocate his family to the river valley in May 1810. On June 10 of that year, the family reached Dansville and established a homestead.

Upon his arrival, Rochester quickly became a leading citizen of Dansville, establishing numerous businesses and mills and playing an active role in the early politics of the town. He offered to sell his share of the Upper Falls tract to Major Carroll, though Carroll convinced him to keep his interest. In January 1814, Rochester sold his property and holdings in Dansville—a grist mill, sawmill, 700 acres of land, interest in a wool carding shop, and the first paper mill in Western New York—for $24,000 (~$429,603 in 2024) and moved to East Bloomfield in Ontario County.

=== Rochesterville ===
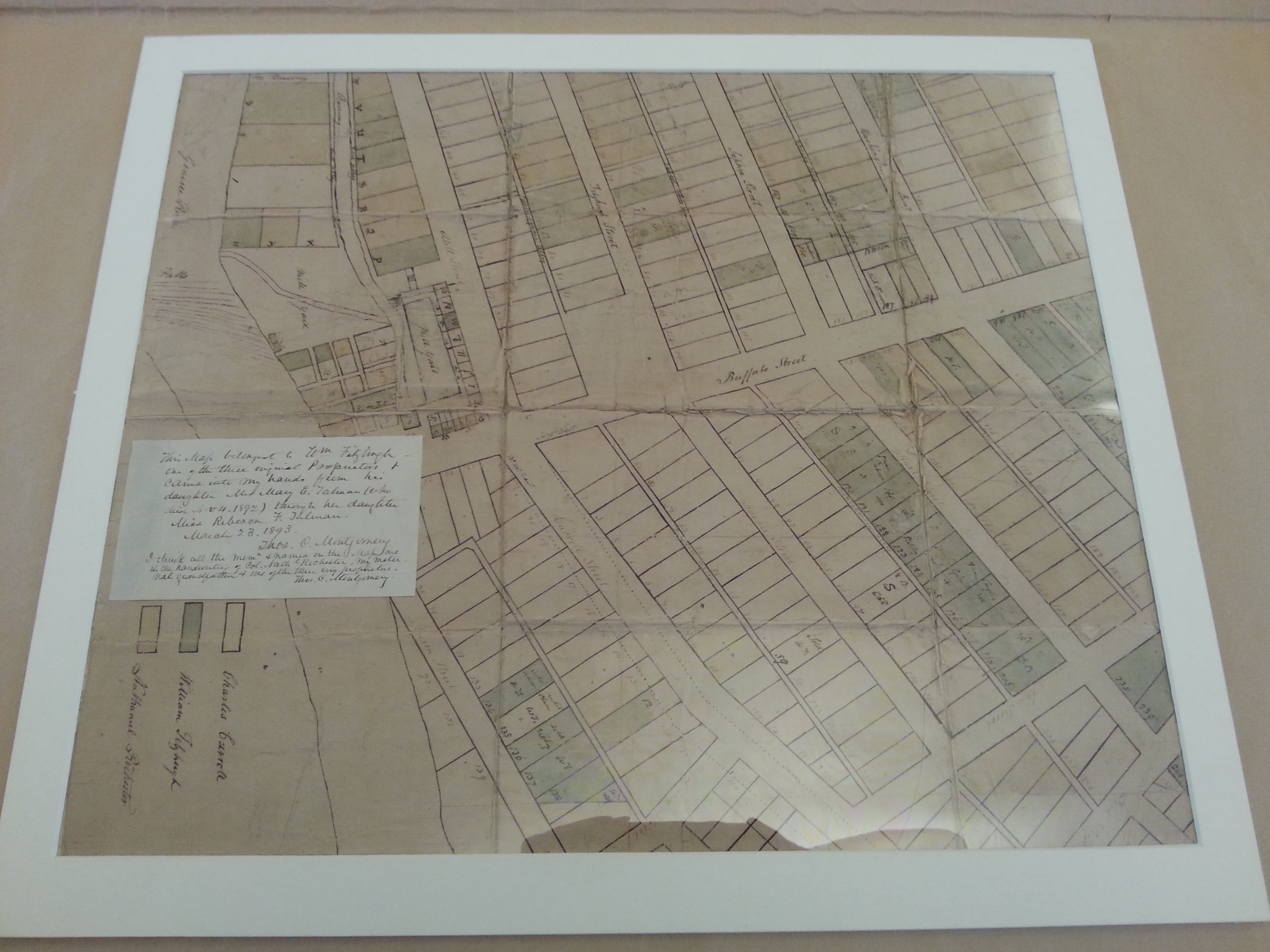
This hand-drawn map, believed to have been penned by Nathaniel Rochester, shows lots owned by Rochester, Fitzhugh, and Carroll.

In 1811, Rochester began establishing a town on the Upper Falls tract. He laid out streets on a gridiron pattern and established plots of land for municipal, church, and business use. Later that year, he began to offer quarter-acre lots for sale on the two main roads—Buffalo Street running east to west and leading to a bridge across the river, and Mill Street running north to south. Lots were sold for $50, except for the northwest lot at Four Corners which sold for $200; lots on adjoining streets were sold for $30 and buyers were required to pay a $5 deposit and build a home or business twenty-by-sixteen feet within one year. Rochester reserved a large lot on Buffalo Street for public buildings. While the settlement had previously been called The Falls or Falls Town, the three partners agreed to the name "Rochesterville." When later accused of vanity for the name Rochester quipped, "Should I call [the village] Fitzhugh or Carroll, the slighted gentleman would certainly feel offended with the other; but if I called it by my name, they would most likely be angry with me; so, it is best to call it Rochester and serve both alike."

On May 1, 1812, the first settler Hamlet Scrantom arrived with his family. Work on their cabin at Four Corners was not yet finished, so the family stayed with Rochester's land agent Enos Stone, who had been living in Allen's former mill on the east side of the river, until its completion on July 4, 1812. Next came Jehiel Barnard, arriving on September 1 and erecting the settlement's first tailor shop, which would also become its first meeting house and church. Other initial settlers included Abelard Reynolds, who established a pioneer saddlery and the village's first post office, Silas O. Smith; Elisha and Hervey Eli; and Josiah Bissel, Jr. In 1814, it's believed that Reynolds' son, Mortimer, was the first white child born in Rochester;

The War of 1812 helped Rochesterville grow as settlers living in Charlotte and other settlements along the shore of Lake Ontario sought to move farther inland. Furthermore, numerous skirmishes and war activities were taking place throughout western New York, and Rochesterville served as a waypoint and depot for military supplies. The exposure proved advantageous for the settlement, as many people who had traveled through purchased lots or tracts in or near the village. One lot, which sold for $200 in 1811, would eventually sell for $11,200 in January 1817.

In 1817, Rochester served on a committee to petition the state to build what would become the Erie Canal on a proposed northern route that included a crossing on the Genesee River at Rochesterville. The government eventually accepted this route, contributing to the growth of the future city. In late 1817, Rochester helped petition the state to incorporate Rochesterville. Although the first petition failed due to opposition from neighboring jurisdictions, a second petition passed, and the City of Rochester was incorporated on 21 April. The suffix -ville was dropped in 1822. Also in 1817, Rochester was part of a group that organized St. Luke's Episcopal Church in Genesee Falls, with Rochester serving as its first Senior Warden. Eventually, Rochester gave land for the church building on Fitzhugh Street.

In 1821 Rochester played a pivotal role in the creation of Monroe County, which Rochester named after President James Monroe. When the county was officially formed, Rochester became its first county clerk and was elected its first representative to the New York State Assembly.

== Later years ==
Rochester remained an active participant in the growth of the town and county he founded, playing many roles in developing its economy and status. He played an active role in politics, helped found churches and banks, and served as the first president of the Rochester Athenænum, which would later become Rochester Institute of Technology.

During the last two years of his life, Rochester made few public appearances but spent most of his time with his now rather large family, including his 28 grandchildren. Rochester died on May 17, 1831, suffering from a protracted and painful illness. He was interred at Mount Hope Cemetery in Rochester.

== Personal life ==
In 1788, Rochester married Sophia Beatty in Hagerstown, Maryland. Together they had twelve children, among them Judge and Congressman William B. Rochester and Mayor Thomas H. Rochester. William B. Rochester Jr., the son of William B. Rochester, served as Paymaster-General of the United States Army.

=== Legacy ===
The Rochester Institute of Technology had a dormitory named Nathaniel Rochester Hall, the third tallest of the campus' four dormitory towers. This dormitory was later renamed Fredericka Douglass Sprague Perry Hall. This change was made due to Nathaniel Rochester's involvement with the slave trade. Nathaniel Square Park, at the intersection of South Avenue and Alexander Street in the South Wedge neighborhood, is home to a statue of Nathaniel Rochester sitting on a bench, sculpted by Pepsy Kettavong. There was also a school in the city of Rochester named Nathaniel Rochester Community School (School No. 3.) However it was renamed in 2021 to the Dr. Alice Holloway Young School of Excellence due to Rochester's ownership of slaves.

=== Slavery ===
A 1790 account book, purchased from Rochester's descendants by the University of Rochester's Rush Rhees Library, uncovered Nathaniel Rochester's involvement in the slave trade. The ledger shows the purchase and subsequent sale of human beings by Rochester and his partners in that year, though it is unknown to what extent he participated in the slave trade in other years.

When Rochester, Fitzhugh, and Carroll made their initial journey to the Genesee Country in September 1800, there were accompanied by at least one enslaved person. When Rochester moved from Hagerstown to Dansville in 1810, he brought about half a dozen enslaved people with him.

According to an 1811 document, Rochester did free two of his slaves. A document of manumission states: "... and by these presents, do, manumit and make free from slavery, my negro slave named Benjamin, about 16 years old, and my Negro Slave Cassandra about 14 years old." Another document shows that on the same day, Cassandra was made an indentured servant who would learn to read and write and "the art and mystery of a Cook...until the said apprentice shall accomplish her full age of eighteen years."

== Sources ==
- McKelvey, Blake (January 1962). "Colonel Nathaniel Rochester" (PDF). Rochester History. XXIV (1). Rochester Public Library.
- Stokes, Durward (October 1961). "Nathaniel Rochester in North Carolina". The North Carolina Historical Review. XXXVIII (4): 467–481.
- Clune, Henry (1963). The Genesee. Syracuse, NY: Syracuse University Press. ISBN 0815624360.
