= National Register of Historic Places listings in Rochester, New York =

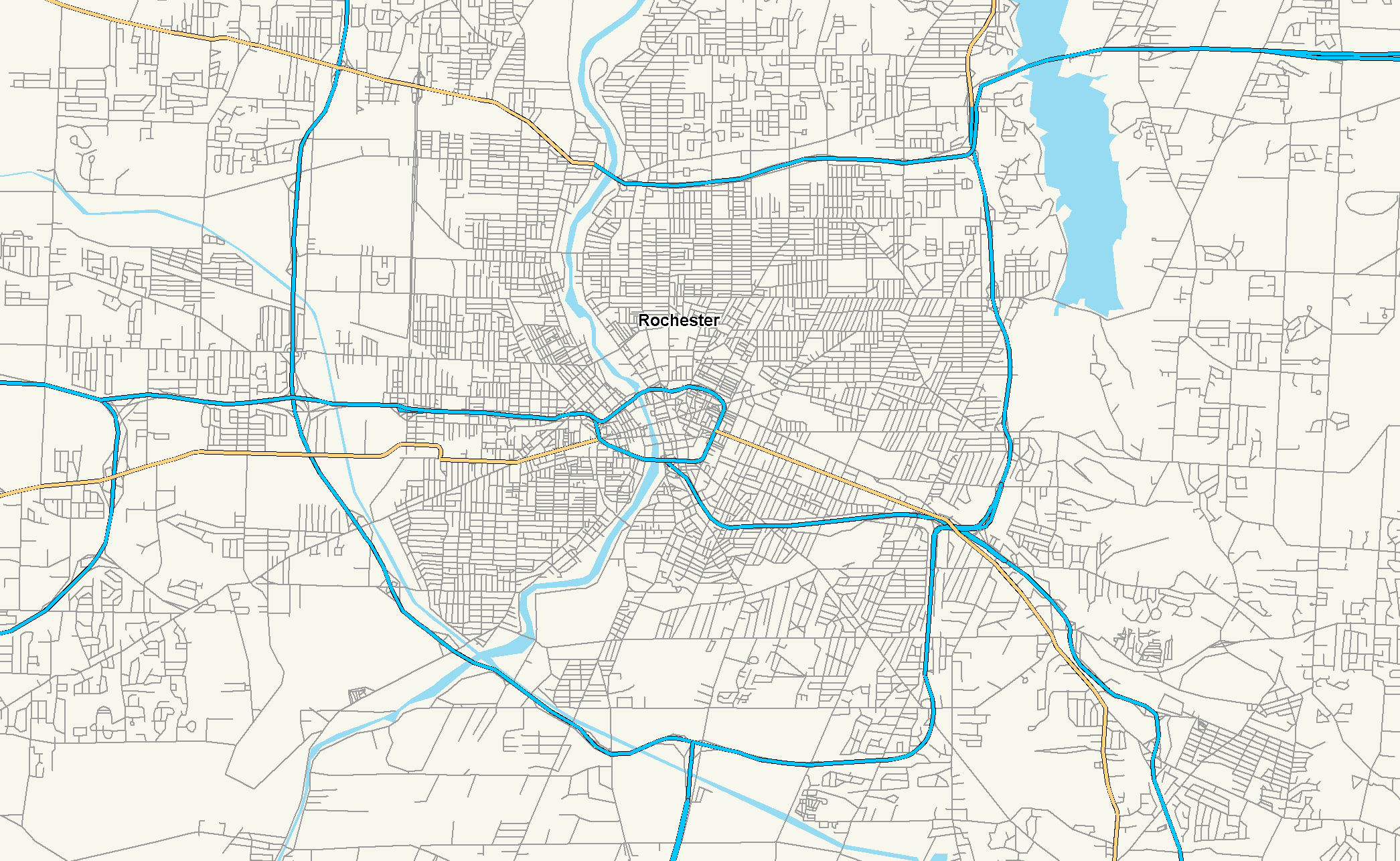
Detailed map of Rochester

This is intended to be a complete list of properties and districts listed on the National Register of Historic Places in Rochester, New York, United States. The locations of National Register properties and districts (at least for all showing latitude and longitude coordinates below) may be seen in an online map by clicking on "Map of all coordinates".

There are 231 properties and districts listed on the National Register in Monroe County, including three National Historic Landmarks. The city of Rochester includes 124 of these properties and districts, including all National Historic Landmarks; they are listed here, while the remaining properties and districts are listed separately. One property, the New York State Barge Canal, a National Historic Landmark District spans both the city and the remainder of the county. Another property in Rochester was formerly listed and has been removed.

This National Park Service list is complete through NPS recent listings posted October 9, 2026.

== Current listings ==
| | Name on the Register | Image | Date listed | Location | City or town | Description |
|---|---|---|---|---|---|---|
| 1 | Andrews Street Bridge | Andrews Street Bridge | October 11, 1984 (#84000182) | Andrews St. at Genesee River; 43°09′32″N 77°36′45″W | Rochester | |
| 2 | Susan B. Anthony House | Susan B. Anthony House | October 15, 1966 (#66000528) | 17 Madison St. 43°09′12″N 77°37′41″W | Rochester | This NHL is where Susan B. Anthony was arrested after attempting to vote in the 1872 Presidential Election |
| 3 | Aquinas Institute | Aquinas Institute | June 8, 1989 (#89000464) | 1127 Dewey Ave. 43°11′15″N 77°38′26″W | Rochester | |
| 4 | Arvine Heights Historic District | Arvine Heights Historic District | June 1, 2015 (#15000310) | 15–120 Arvine Heights; 43°07′35″N 77°38′21″W | Rochester | Early 20th-century middle-class residential development |
| 5 | Azalea-Highland Park Terrace Historic District | | March 11, 2024 (#100010023) | Portions of Meadowbrook, Azalea, Laney, Arbor Roads and Highland & Elmwood Avenues; 43°07′38″N 77°36′21″W | Rochester | |
| 6 | Bevier Memorial Building | Bevier Memorial Building | October 25, 1973 (#73001201) | Washington St. 43°09′12″N 77°36′59″W | Rochester | Built in 1910 for the Rochester Athaneaum and Mechanics Institute, a three and a half brick story with ceramic trim designed by architect Claude Fayette Bragdon. |
| 7 | Brick Presbyterian Church Complex | Brick Presbyterian Church Complex | March 12, 1992 (#92000152) | 121 N. Fitzhugh St. 43°09′27″N 77°37′01″W | Rochester | Now known as Downtown United Presbyterian Church, a Presbyterian church complex including the Brick Church and Church School (1860, rebuilt 1903), attached Brick Church Institute building (1909–1910), and Taylor Chapel (1941). The Brick Church and Church School was designed in 1860 as an Early Romanesque Revival–style edifice by Rochester architect Andrew Jackson Warner (1833–1910). His son, J. Foster Warner (1859–1937), modified the church structure to the Lombard Romanesque form in 1903. Part of the Inner Loop Multiple Resource Area (MRA). |
| 8 | Bridge Square Historic District | Bridge Square Historic District | October 11, 1984 (#84000273) | Roughly bounded by Inner Loop, Centre Park, Washington and W. Main Sts. 43°09′17″N 77°37′08″W | Rochester | part of the Inner Loop MRA |
| 9 | Brown's Race Historic District | Brown's Race Historic District | March 2, 1989 (#89000067) | Brown's Race St. from Platt St. to Conrail railroad tracks 43°09′38″N 77°36′59″W | Rochester | District of 15 commercial buildings, 2 other structures and 14 sites, along or near the curving south rim of the Genesee River gorge at the rim of the High Falls. Included are the mill race and the 19th century iron Pont De Rennes bridge, which is in use as a pedestrian bridge and viewing platform of the High Falls and surrounding gorge. |
| 10 | Adam Brown Block | Adam Brown Block | October 4, 1985 (#85002857) | 480 E. Main St. 43°09′31″N 77°35′59″W | Rochester | part of the Inner Loop MRA |
| 11 | Browncroft Historic District | Browncroft Historic District | April 20, 2004 (#04000346) | Roughly bounded by Browncroft Blvd., Newcastle, Blossom, and Winton Rds. 43°09′16″N 77°32′44″W | Rochester | |
| 12 | Building at 216-222 South Avenue | | May 13, 2024 (#100010273) | 216-222 South Avenue; 43°09′07″N 77°36′25″W | Rochester | |
| 13 | Building at 551–555 North Goodman Street | Building at 551–555 North Goodman Street | March 20, 1986 (#86000448) | 551–555 N. Goodman St. 43°09′50″N 77°35′00″W | Rochester | |
| 14 | Campbell-Whittlesey House | Campbell-Whittlesey House | February 18, 1971 (#71000542) | 123 S. Fitzhugh St. 43°09′04″N 77°36′45″W | Rochester | |
| 15 | Central Trust Bank Building | Central Trust Bank Building | February 14, 2012 (#12000014) | 44 Exchange Rd. 43°09′18″N 77°36′42″W | Rochester | |
| 16 | Chamber of Commerce | Chamber of Commerce | October 4, 1985 (#85002859) | 55 Saint Paul St. 43°09′28″N 77°36′36″W | Rochester | part of the Inner Loop MRA |
| 17 | Jonathan Child House & Brewster-Burke House Historic District | Jonathan Child House & Brewster-Burke House Historic District | February 18, 1971 (#71000543) | 37 S. Washington St. and 130 Spring St. 43°09′10″N 77°37′01″W | Rochester | |
| 18 | Chili–West Historic District | Chili–West Historic District | September 1, 2015 (#15000556) | 15–17 Ardmore, 5–75 Appleton, 14–48 Darien, 22–56 Hancock, 41–146 Lozier & 20–99 Somerset Sts., 50–432 Chili Ave. 43°08′54″N 77°38′42″W | Rochester | Early suburban neighborhood completed by mid-1930s |
| 19 | Christ Church | Christ Church | February 12, 2008 (#08000024) | 141 East Ave. 43°09′12″N 77°35′26″W | Rochester | |
| 20 | Church of Saints Peter and Paul Complex | Church of Saints Peter and Paul Complex | June 20, 2012 (#12000342) | 720 & 736 W. Main, & 681 Brown Sts. 43°09′06″N 77°37′57″W | Rochester | |
| 21 | City Hall Historic District | City Hall Historic District | September 17, 1974 (#74001258) | S. Fitzhugh St. between Broad and W. Main Sts. 43°09′16″N 77°36′50″W | Rochester | |
| 22 | Colgate-Rochester (Crozer) Divinity School | | May 12, 2025 (#100011782) | 1100-1122 South Goodman Street and 117-125 Highland Parkway; 43°07′56″N 77°36′00″W | Rochester | |
| 23 | Congregation Ahavas Achim Anshi Austria | Congregation Ahavas Achim Anshi Austria | November 9, 2015 (#15000775) | 692 Joseph Ave. 43°10′38″N 77°36′34″W | Rochester | 1928 Georgian Revival synagogue was early focal point for Jewish immigrant community in city's northeast |
| 24 | H. C. Cohen Company Building-Andrews Building | H. C. Cohen Company Building-Andrews Building | October 4, 1985 (#85002853) | 216 Andrews St. 43°09′35″N 77°36′34″W | Rochester | part of the Inner Loop MRA |
| 25 | Court Exchange Building-National Casket Company | Court Exchange Building-National Casket Company | October 4, 1985 (#85002850) | 142 Exchange St. 43°09′09″N 77°36′40″W | Rochester | part of the Inner Loop MRA |
| 26 | Court Street Bridge | Court Street Bridge | October 11, 1984 (#84000276) | Court St. at Genesee River; 43°09′12″N 77°36′34″W | Rochester | |
| 27 | Cox Building | Cox Building | October 11, 1984 (#84000279) | 36–48 St. Paul St. 43°09′27″N 77°36′34″W | Rochester | |
| 28 | Crosman Terrace Historic District | Crosman Terrace Historic District | October 28, 2022 (#100008317) | 21 to 188 Crosman Terr. 43°08′19″N 77°35′09″W | Rochester | |
| 29 | Chester Dewey School No. 14 | Chester Dewey School No. 14 | October 4, 1985 (#85002847) | 200 University Ave. 43°09′35″N 77°35′51″W | Rochester | part of the Inner Loop MRA |
| 30 | East Avenue Historic District | East Avenue Historic District | April 17, 1979 (#79001589) | Irregular pattern along East Ave. from Probert St. to Alexander St. 43°09′09″N 77°34′51″W | Rochester | |
| 31 | East High School | East High School | June 30, 1983 (#83001707) | 410 Alexander St. 43°09′35″N 77°35′31″W | Rochester | |
| 32 | East Main Street Historic District | East Main Street Historic District | December 13, 2017 (#100001069) | E. Main St. from South to Chestnut, East, Euclid, Clinton, Stone, Division, Elm, Atlas, Achilles & Franklin; 43°09′26″N 77°36′23″W | Rochester | |
| 33 | East Side Presbyterian Church | East Side Presbyterian Church | November 10, 2010 (#10000898) | 345 Parsells St. 43°09′56″N 77°34′10″W | Rochester | |
| 34 | Eastman Dental Dispensary | Eastman Dental Dispensary | April 28, 1983 (#83001708) | 800 E. Main St. 43°09′38″N 77°35′30″W | Rochester | |
| 35 | George Eastman House | George Eastman House | November 13, 1966 (#66000529) | 900 East Ave. 43°09′12″N 77°34′54″W | Rochester | |
| 36 | Edwards Building | Edwards Building | October 11, 1984 (#84000287) | 26–34 St. Paul St. 43°09′26″N 77°36′33″W | Rochester | |
| 37 | Ellwanger and Barry Building | Ellwanger and Barry Building | January 27, 2022 (#100007376) | 39-41 State St. 43°09′23″N 77°36′48″W | Rochester | |
| 38 | Ellwanger & Barry-Highland Park Historic District | | May 23, 2024 (#100010347) | Portions of Linden, Crawford, Mulberry, Meigs, Rockingham and South Goodman Streets; Gregory Hill Road, Mt. Vernon Avenue, Greenview Drive, & Highland Parkway; 43°08′14″N 77°36′03″W | Rochester | |
| 39 | Hervey Ely House | Hervey Ely House | August 12, 1971 (#71000544) | 138 Troup St. 43°09′05″N 77°37′06″W | Rochester | |
| 40 | Emmanuel Presbyterian Church | Emmanuel Presbyterian Church | March 29, 2001 (#01000295) | Jefferson Ave. at 9 Shelter St. 43°08′19″N 77°37′47″W | Rochester | |
| 41 | English Evangelical Church of the Reformation and Parish House | English Evangelical Church of the Reformation and Parish House | March 12, 1992 (#92000150) | 111 N. Chestnut St. 43°09′32″N 77°36′12″W | Rochester | part of the Inner Loop MRA |
| 42 | Erie Canal: Second Genesee Aqueduct | Erie Canal: Second Genesee Aqueduct | September 29, 1976 (#76001228) | Broad St. 43°09′17″N 77°36′35″W | Rochester | |
| 43 | Federal Building | Federal Building | April 13, 1972 (#72000856) | N. Fitzhugh and Church Sts. 43°09′25″N 77°36′54″W | Rochester | |
| 44 | Fernwood Park Historic District | Fernwood Park Historic District | June 21, 2010 (#10000360) | Bounded by Fernwood Ave., Woodman Park, Culver Rd., and Waring Rd. 43°10′48″N 77°33′45″W | Rochester | |
| 45 | First National Bank of Rochester-Old Monroe County Savings Bank Building | First National Bank of Rochester-Old Monroe County Savings Bank Building | October 4, 1985 (#85002861) | 35 State St. 43°09′22″N 77°36′49″W | Rochester | part of the Inner Loop MRA |
| 46 | First Presbyterian Church | First Presbyterian Church | October 25, 1973 (#73001202) | 101 S. Plymouth Ave. 43°09′10″N 77°36′56″W | Rochester | |
| 47 | First Unitarian Church | First Unitarian Church | September 2, 2014 (#14000537) | 220 Winton Rd., S. 43°08′28″N 77°33′33″W | Rochester | 1969 brick Modernist structure by Louis Kahn |
| 48 | First Universalist Church | First Universalist Church | May 27, 1971 (#71000545) | SE corner of S. Clinton Ave. and Court St. 43°09′14″N 77°36′17″W | Rochester | |
| 49 | Four Corners-Genesee Crossroads Historic District | Four Corners-Genesee Crossroads Historic District | April 12, 2024 (#100010188) | Portions of Andrews, Aqueduct, E & W Broad, N & S Fitzhugh, Graves, E & W Main, Race, Saint Paul, State, N Water streets; N Plymouth Ave. & Exchange Blvd; 43°09′21″N 77°36′45″W | Rochester | |
| 50 | Gannett Building | Gannett Building | October 4, 1985 (#85002862) | 55 Exchange St. 43°09′14″N 77°36′45″W | Rochester | part of the Inner Loop MRA |
| 51 | Genesee Lighthouse | Genesee Lighthouse | August 13, 1974 (#74001259) | 70 Lighthouse St. 43°15′10″N 77°36′40″W | Rochester | |
| 52 | German United Evangelical Church Complex | German United Evangelical Church Complex | March 12, 1992 (#92000151) | 60–90 Bittner St. 43°09′38″N 77°36′34″W | Rochester | part of the Inner Loop MRA |
| 53 | Granite Building | Granite Building | October 11, 1984 (#84000290) | 130 E. Main St. 43°09′25″N 77°36′33″W | Rochester | Built in 1894 to house the Sibley, Lindsay and Curr department store. |
| 54 | Gregory Tract Historic District | | January 19, 2022 (#100007350) | Portions of Benton, Caroline, Cayuga, Diem, Gregory, Linden, Meigs, Nicholson, Oakland, Seager, South Goodman, and Weider Sts., Carroll and Goebel Pls., Mt. Vernon and South Clinton Aves., Washburn Park; 43°08′25″N 77°36′05″W | Rochester | |
| 55 | Grove Place Historic District | Grove Place Historic District | October 11, 1984 (#84000299) | Gibbs, Selden, Grove and Windsor Sts. 43°09′35″N 77°36′03″W | Rochester | part of the Inner Loop MRA |
| 56 | David Hagaman House | David Hagaman House | December 23, 1994 (#94001477) | 661 Highland Ave. 43°07′50″N 77°35′45″W | Rochester | |
| 57 | Nathaniel Hawthorne School No. 25 | | May 4, 2026 (#100012957) | 965 North Goodman Street; 43°10′18″N 77°34′42″W | Rochester | |
| 58 | Hickey-Freeman Company Building | Hickey-Freeman Company Building | October 26, 2022 (#100008310) | 1155 North Clinton Ave., 24 Morrill St., and 313 Ave. D 43°10′49″N 77°36′49″W | Rochester | |
| 59 | Holy Rosary Church Complex | Holy Rosary Church Complex | September 4, 2012 (#12000597) | 414 Lexington Ave. 43°10′47″N 77°38′29″W | Rochester | |
| 60 | House at 235–237 Reynolds Street | House at 235–237 Reynolds Street | September 12, 1985 (#85002272) | 235–237 Reynolds St. 43°08′35″N 77°37′36″W | Rochester | |
| 61 | Immaculate Conception Roman Catholic Church Complex | Immaculate Conception Roman Catholic Church Complex | March 31, 1992 (#92000381) | 445 Frederick Douglass St. and 187 and 205 Edinburgh St. 43°08′47″N 77°37′04″W | Rochester | |
| 62 | Immanuel Baptist Church | Immanuel Baptist Church | February 5, 2002 (#01001566) | 815 Park Ave. 43°08′48″N 77°34′28″W | Rochester | |
| 63 | Inglewood and Thurston Historic District | Inglewood and Thurston Historic District | June 30, 2015 (#15000368) | 15–218 Inglewood Dr., 169-291 Thurston Rd. & 5 Marlborough; 43°08′26″N 77°39′15″W | Rochester | |
| 64 | Jewish Young Men's and Women's Association | Jewish Young Men's and Women's Association | October 4, 1985 (#85002848) | 400 Andrews St. 43°09′37″N 77°36′16″W | Rochester | part of the Inner Loop MRA |
| 65 | Kirstein Building | Kirstein Building | October 4, 1985 (#85002844) | 242 Andrews St. 43°09′36″N 77°36′28″W | Rochester | part of the Inner Loop MRA |
| 66 | Lawyers Cooperative Publishing Company Complex | Lawyers Cooperative Publishing Company Complex | December 10, 2021 (#100007212) | 52 and 28-50 Aqueduct, 40-50 East Broad, 38-46 Graves, and 11 Race Sts. 43°09′19″N 77°36′40″W | Rochester | |
| 67 | Lehigh Valley Railroad Station | Lehigh Valley Railroad Station | October 4, 1985 (#85002858) | 99 Court St. 43°09′11″N 77°36′29″W | Rochester | Currently Dinosaur Bar-B-Que; part of the Inner Loop MRA |
| 68 | Leopold Street Shule | Leopold Street Shule | June 7, 1974 (#74001260) | 30 Leopold St. 43°09′53″N 77°36′16″W | Rochester | |
| 69 | Linden-South Historic District | Linden-South Historic District | August 26, 2009 (#09000655) | 25–272 Linden St., 809–835 South Ave. 43°08′20″N 77°36′21″W | Rochester | |
| 70 | Little Theatre | Little Theatre | October 4, 1985 (#85002860) | 240 East Ave. 43°09′21″N 77°35′52″W | Rochester | part of the Inner Loop MRA |
| 71 | Madison Square-West Main Street Historic District | Madison Square-West Main Street Historic District | November 3, 1988 (#88002382) | Roughly bounded by Silver, Canal, W. Main and Madison Sts. 43°09′14″N 77°37′37″W | Rochester | |
| 72 | Main Street Bridge | Main Street Bridge | October 11, 1984 (#84000303) | Main St. at Genesee River; 43°09′22″N 77°36′39″W | Rochester | |
| 73 | Maplewood Historic District | Maplewood Historic District | December 8, 1997 (#97001454) | 21–267 Alameda, 26–284 Albemarle, 21–148 Augustine, 36–68 Birr Sts., 1–9 Burke Terrace, 1136–1212 Dewey Ave. 43°07′26″N 77°37′44″W | Rochester | Neighborhood built around Frederick Law Olmsted landscapes; district expanded in 2016. |
| 74 | Leander McCord Houses Historic District | | November 10, 2021 (#100007111) | 249, 259, 267, 275, and 285 Maplewood Dr. 43°11′47″N 77°37′25″W | Rochester | |
| 75 | Michaels-Stern Building | Michaels-Stern Building | October 4, 1985 (#85002854) | 87 N. Clinton Ave. 43°09′31″N 77°36′28″W | Rochester | part of the Inner Loop MRA |
| 76 | George J. Michelsen Furniture Factory | George J. Michelsen Furniture Factory | June 6, 2012 (#12000328) | 182 Avenue D 43°10′49″N 77°37′11″W | Rochester | |
| 77 | Mount Hope Cemetery | Mount Hope Cemetery | April 30, 2018 (#100002361) | Bounded by Mount Hope and Elmwood Aves., and Intercampus Dr. 43°07′39″N 77°37′10″W | Rochester | Early rural cemetery is final resting place of Frederick Douglass and Susan B. Anthony, among other notables. |
| 78 | Mt. Hope-Highland Historic District | Mt. Hope-Highland Historic District | January 21, 1974 (#74001261) | Bounded roughly by the Clarissa St. Bridge, Genesee River, Grove and Mt. Hope Aves. 43°08′09″N 77°36′40″W | Rochester | A boundary increase was approved February 20, 2024. |
| 79 | National Company Building | National Company Building | October 11, 1984 (#84000291) | 159 E. Main St. 43°09′23″N 77°36′29″W | Rochester | |
| 80 | Naval Armory-Convention Hall | Naval Armory-Convention Hall | October 4, 1985 (#85002852) | 75 Woodbury Blvd. 43°09′08″N 77°36′19″W | Rochester | Currently houses the Geva Theatre Center; part of the Inner Loop MRA |
| 81 | Nazareth House | Nazareth House | April 12, 1984 (#84002734) | 94 Averill Ave. 43°08′39″N 77°36′35″W | Rochester | |
| 82 | New York State Barge Canal | New York State Barge Canal | October 15, 2014 (#14000860) | Linear across city 43°09′52″N 77°40′35″W | Rochester | Successor to Erie Canal approved by state voters in early 20th century to compete with railroads. |
| 83 | Norton Village Historic District | Norton Village Historic District | June 21, 2010 (#10000362) | Norton St., Norton Village Ln., Village Way, and Veteran St. 43°11′14″N 77°33′58″W | Rochester | |
| 84 | O'Kane Market and O'Kane Building | O'Kane Market and O'Kane Building | September 12, 1985 (#85002288) | 104–106 Bartlett St. & 239–255 Reynolds St. 43°08′34″N 77°37′36″W | Rochester | |
| 85 | Old Stone Warehouse | Old Stone Warehouse | October 15, 1973 (#73001203) | 1 Mt. Hope Ave. 43°08′54″N 77°36′24″W | Rochester | |
| 86 | Our Lady of Victory Roman Catholic Church | Our Lady of Victory Roman Catholic Church | March 12, 1992 (#92000153) | 210 Pleasant St. 43°09′32″N 77°36′33″W | Rochester | part of the Inner Loop MRA |
| 87 | Park Avenue Historic District | Park Avenue Historic District | February 20, 2020 (#100004981) | Portions of Alexander, Audubon, Barrington, Berkeley, Berkshire, Beverly, Brighton, Brunswick, Calumet, Cambridge, Colby, Cornell, Dartmouth, Darwin, Donlon, Edgerton, Ericsson, Faraday, Girard, Harlem, Harper, Harvard, Homer, & Meigs Sts., et al. 43°08′56″N 77°34′52″W | Rochester | |
| 88 | Polvino Building | Polvino Building | December 23, 2019 (#100004804) | 216 Central Park; 43°10′07″N 77°35′21″W | Rochester | 1925 building was home to many businesses opened by Italian immigrants |
| 89 | Powers Building and Powers Hotel | Powers Building and Powers Hotel | April 3, 1973 (#73001204) | W. Main and State Sts. 43°09′21″N 77°36′48″W | Rochester | 1869 building was once city's tallest; adjacent hotel included in 2019 boundary increase |
| 90 | Pulaski Library | Pulaski Library | February 5, 2002 (#01001562) | 1151 Hudson Ave. 43°11′11″N 77°36′00″W | Rochester | |
| 91 | Ramona Park Historic District | Ramona Park Historic District | June 21, 2010 (#10000363) | Ramona Park; 43°11′50″N 77°39′06″W | Rochester | |
| 92 | Reynolds Arcade | Reynolds Arcade | October 4, 1985 (#85002855) | 16 E. Main St. 43°09′21″N 77°36′44″W | Rochester | part of the Inner Loop MRA |
| 93 | Rochester City School No. 24 | Rochester City School No. 24 | September 15, 1983 (#83001709) | Meigs St. 43°08′10″N 77°36′05″W | Rochester | |
| 94 | Rochester Fire Department Headquarters and Shops | Rochester Fire Department Headquarters and Shops | October 21, 1985 (#85003361) | 185 North St. 43°09′39″N 77°36′16″W | Rochester | part of the Inner Loop MRA |
| 95 | Rochester Savings Bank | Rochester Savings Bank | March 16, 1972 (#72000857) | 40 Franklin St. 43°09′31″N 77°36′18″W | Rochester | |
| 96 | Rundel Memorial Library | Rundel Memorial Library | October 4, 1985 (#85002845) | 115 South Ave. 43°09′13″N 77°37′06″W | Rochester | part of the Inner Loop MRA |
| 97 | Saint Andrew's Episcopal Church | Saint Andrew's Episcopal Church | September 28, 2006 (#06000886) | 95 Averill Ave. 43°08′44″N 77°36′30″W | Rochester | |
| 98 | Saint Bernard's Seminary | Saint Bernard's Seminary | April 18, 1996 (#96000435) | 2260 Lake Ave. 43°12′34″N 77°37′44″W | Rochester | |
| 99 | Saint Mark's and Saint John's Episcopal Church | Saint Mark's and Saint John's Episcopal Church | December 16, 2004 (#04001438) | 1245 Culver Rd. 43°10′05″N 77°33′45″W | Rochester | |
| 100 | Seneca Park East and West | Seneca Park East and West | September 26, 2003 (#03000969) | Saint Paul Blvd., Maplewood Dr, Lake Ave. 43°11′46″N 77°37′31″W | Rochester | West part is known as Maplewood Park. |
| 101 | Shantz Button Factory | Shantz Button Factory | August 13, 2013 (#13000600) | 340 & 330 Rutgers St., 795 Monroe Ave. 43°08′34″N 77°35′25″W | Rochester | |
| 102 | Shingleside | Shingleside | September 13, 1984 (#84002737) | 476 Beach Ave. 43°15′46″N 77°36′56″W | Rochester | |
| 103 | Sibley Triangle Building | Sibley Triangle Building | October 4, 1985 (#85002849) | 20–30 East Ave. 43°09′26″N 77°36′15″W | Rochester | part of the Inner Loop MRA |
| 104 | Sibley's, Lindsay and Curr Building | Sibley's, Lindsay and Curr Building | January 8, 2014 (#84003945) | 228 E. Main St. 43°09′29″N 77°36′21″W | Rochester | Part of the Inner Loop MRA |
| 105 | Sibley–Elmdorf Historic District | Sibley–Elmdorf Historic District | September 1, 2015 (#15000557) | 23–405 Aberdeen, 20–324 Aldine, 447–551 Genesee, 157–320 Melrose, 187–325 Roslyn & 2–242 Trafalgar Sts. 43°08′23″N 77°38′40″W | Rochester | Many extant well-preserved houses in various 19th-century styles |
| 106 | St. Joseph's Church and Rectory | St. Joseph's Church and Rectory | May 29, 1975 (#75001197) | 108 Franklin St. 43°09′34″N 77°36′24″W | Rochester | |
| 107 | St. Mary's Roman Catholic Church and Rectory | St. Mary's Roman Catholic Church and Rectory | March 12, 1992 (#92000154) | 15 St. Mary's Pl. 43°09′12″N 77°36′23″W | Rochester | part of the Inner Loop MRA |
| 108 | St. Paul-North Water Streets Historic District | St. Paul-North Water Streets Historic District | October 11, 1984 (#84000398) | St. Paul, N. Water, and Andrews Sts. 43°09′37″N 77°36′41″W | Rochester | part of the Inner Loop MRA |
| 109 | J. Hungerford Smith Company Factory | | November 10, 2021 (#100007141) | 410 North Goodman and 1115 East Main Sts. 43°09′41″N 77°34′58″W | Rochester | |
| 110 | State Street Historic District | State Street Historic District | October 11, 1984 (#84000402) | 109–173 State St. 43°09′27″N 77°36′55″W | Rochester | part of the Inner Loop MRA |
| 111 | South Wedge Historic District | South Wedge Historic District | May 22, 2013 (#13000307) | 20–98 Alexander, 20–123 Ashland, 39–336 Averill, 14–89 Bond, 38–149 Comfort, 1–396 Gregory, 59–279 Hamilton Sts. 43°08′36″N 77°36′14″W | Rochester | |
| 112 | Teoronto Block Historic District | Teoronto Block Historic District | September 24, 2010 (#10000798) | Bounded by State, Brown, Factory and Mill Streets; 43°09′43″N 77°37′09″W | Rochester | |
| 113 | Terminal Building | Terminal Building | January 11, 2017 (#100000482) | 65 W. Broad St. 43°09′14″N 77°36′50″W | Rochester | Mid-1920s building was first to front on Broad Street after Erie Canal aqueduct was converted into a surface road |
| 114 | Third Ward Historic District | Third Ward Historic District | July 12, 1974 (#74001262) | Roughly bounded by Adams and Peach Sts., I-490, and both sides of Troup and Fitzhugh Sts. 43°09′01″N 77°36′56″W | Rochester | A boundary increase was approved November 30, 2023. |
| 115 | Todd Union | Todd Union | May 8, 2023 (#100008906) | 415 Alumni Rd., University of Rochester; 43°07′42″N 77°37′55″W | Rochester | |
| 116 | G.W. Todd-Wilmot Castle Factory Building | G.W. Todd-Wilmot Castle Factory Building | January 29, 2018 (#100002054) | 1255 University Ave. 43°09′03″N 77°34′02″W | Rochester | 1909 factory home to two companies important to early 20th-century local economy |
| 117 | University Club | University Club | October 4, 1985 (#85002851) | 26 Broadway; 43°09′20″N 77°36′00″W | Rochester | part of the Inner Loop MRA |
| 118 | Vanderbeck House | Vanderbeck House | April 9, 1984 (#84002739) | 1295 Lake Ave. 43°11′24″N 77°37′50″W | Rochester | |
| 119 | Timothy Wallace House | Timothy Wallace House | February 4, 1994 (#94000004) | 2169 S. Clinton Ave. 43°06′59″N 77°35′50″W | Rochester | |
| 120 | H. H. Warner Building | H. H. Warner Building | October 4, 1985 (#85002846) | 72–82 St. Paul St. 43°09′30″N 77°36′34″W | Rochester | part of the Inner Loop MRA |
| 121 | Washington Street Rowhouses | Washington Street Rowhouses | October 4, 1985 (#85002856) | 30–32 N. Washington St. 43°09′21″N 77°37′04″W | Rochester | part of the Inner Loop MRA |
| 122 | Ebenezer Watts House | Ebenezer Watts House | October 18, 1996 (#85003632) | 47 S. Fitzhugh St. 43°09′13″N 77°36′50″W | Rochester | Oldest surviving residence in Rochester, an Italianate house built during 1825-1827 and remodelled in the 1850s. Has a Federal style entrance and interior. Part of the Inner Loop MRA. |
| 123 | Wilder Building | Wilder Building | October 4, 1985 (#85002863) | 1 E. Main St. 43°09′19″N 77°36′44″W | Rochester | part of the Inner Loop MRA |
| 124 | Wollensak Optical Company Building | Wollensak Optical Company Building | July 27, 2018 (#100002739) | 872 Hudson St. 43°10′52″N 77°35′56″W | Rochester | 1920s building was home to Wollensak, industry-leading lensmaker which expanded into other audiovisual sectors, until 1972 |

== Former listing ==
| | Name on the Register | Image | Date listed | Date removed | Location | City or town | Description |
|---|---|---|---|---|---|---|---|
| 1 | Duffy-Powers Building | | October 11, 1984 (#84000284) | March 8, 1985 | 50 W. Main St. | Rochester | part of the Department Store TR; removed due to owner objection. |

== See also ==
- National Register of Historic Places listings in New York
