= Vanderbeck House =

Vanderbeck House may refer to:

- Vanderbeck House (Mahwah, New Jersey), Bergen County
- Vanderbeck House (Ridgewood, New Jersey), Bergen County
- Vanderbeck House (Rochester, New York)

== See also ==
- Tallman–Vanderbeck House, Closter, New Jersey, in Bergen County
- Jacob Vanderbeck Jr. House, Fair Lawn, New Jersey, in Bergen County
