= Chili–West Historic District =

Historic district in New York, United States

- U.S. National Register of Historic Places
- U.S. Historic district
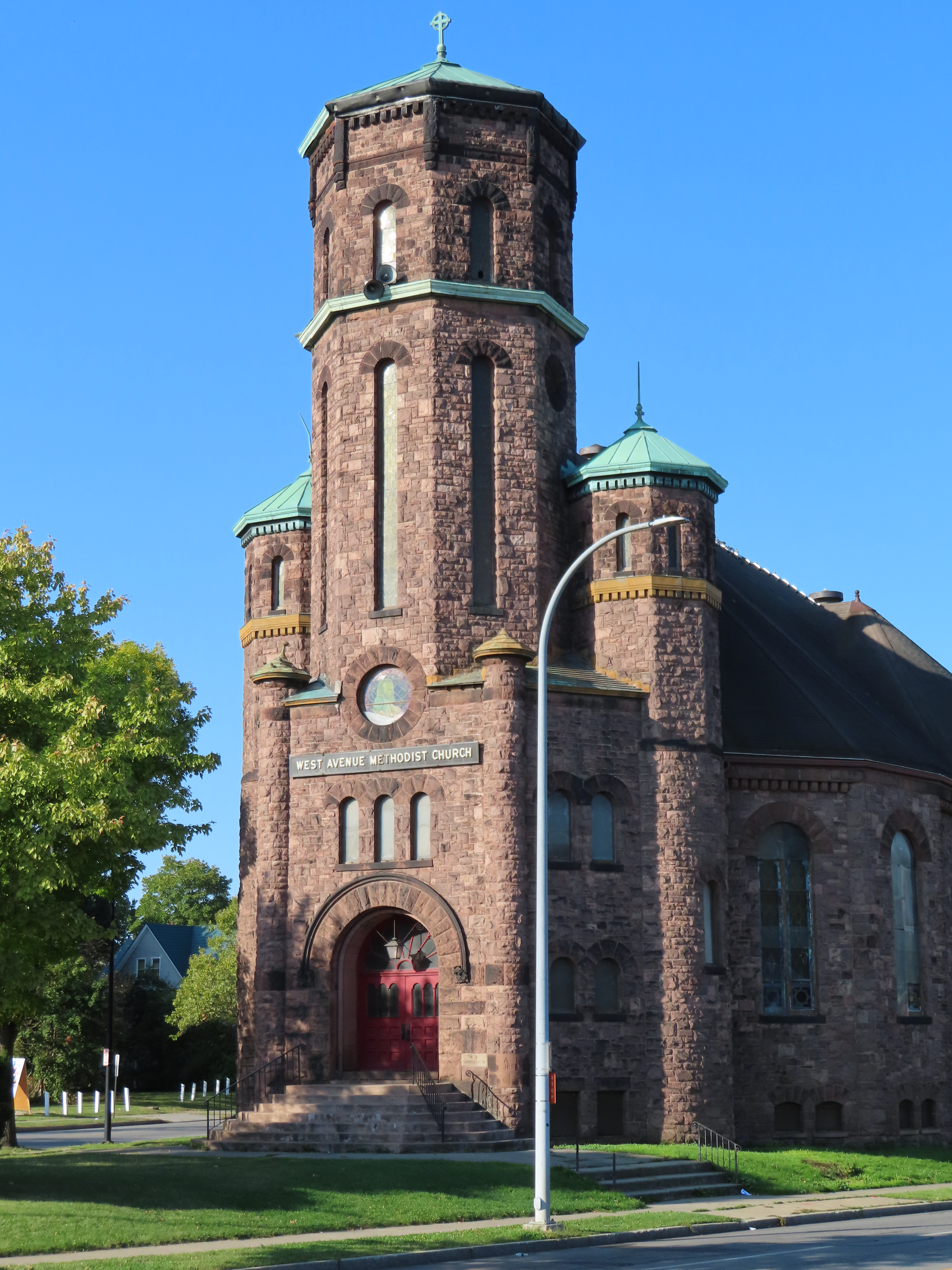

- Location within New York Location within the United States
- Location: 15-17 Ardmore, 5-75 Appleton, 14-48 Darien, 22-56 Hancock, 41-146 Lozier & 20-99 Somerset Sts., 50-432 Chili Ave., Rochester, New York
- Coordinates: 43°08′54″N 77°38′42″W
- Area: 72.78 acres (29.45 ha)
- Built: c. 1874-1935
- Built by: A.B. Jennings and Otis Dryer; James Burns Arnold; A. Friederich & Sons
- Architectural style: Queen Anne, Stick, Eastlake, Colonial Revival, Gothic Revival, Tudor Revival, Spanish Mission, Prairie, Bungalow/Craftsman
- NRHP reference No.: 15000556
- Added to NRHP: September 1, 2015

Chili–West Historic District is a national historic district located at Rochester, Monroe County, New York. The district encompasses 508 contributing buildings (351 primary buildings) in a predominantly residential section of Rochester. The district developed between about 1874 and 1935, and includes buildings in a variety of architectural styles including Queen Anne, Colonial Revival, Gothic Revival, and Tudor Revival, Mission Revival, and Bungalow / American Craftsman. The dwellings reflect designs directed toward a middle-class and working class clientele in a newly developing area of Rochester's Nineteenth Ward. Located in the district is the former St. Augustine Roman Catholic Church complex.

It was listed on the National Register of Historic Places in 2015.

== See also ==
- National Register of Historic Places listings in Rochester, New York
