= Chester Dewey School No. 14 =

- U.S. National Register of Historic Places
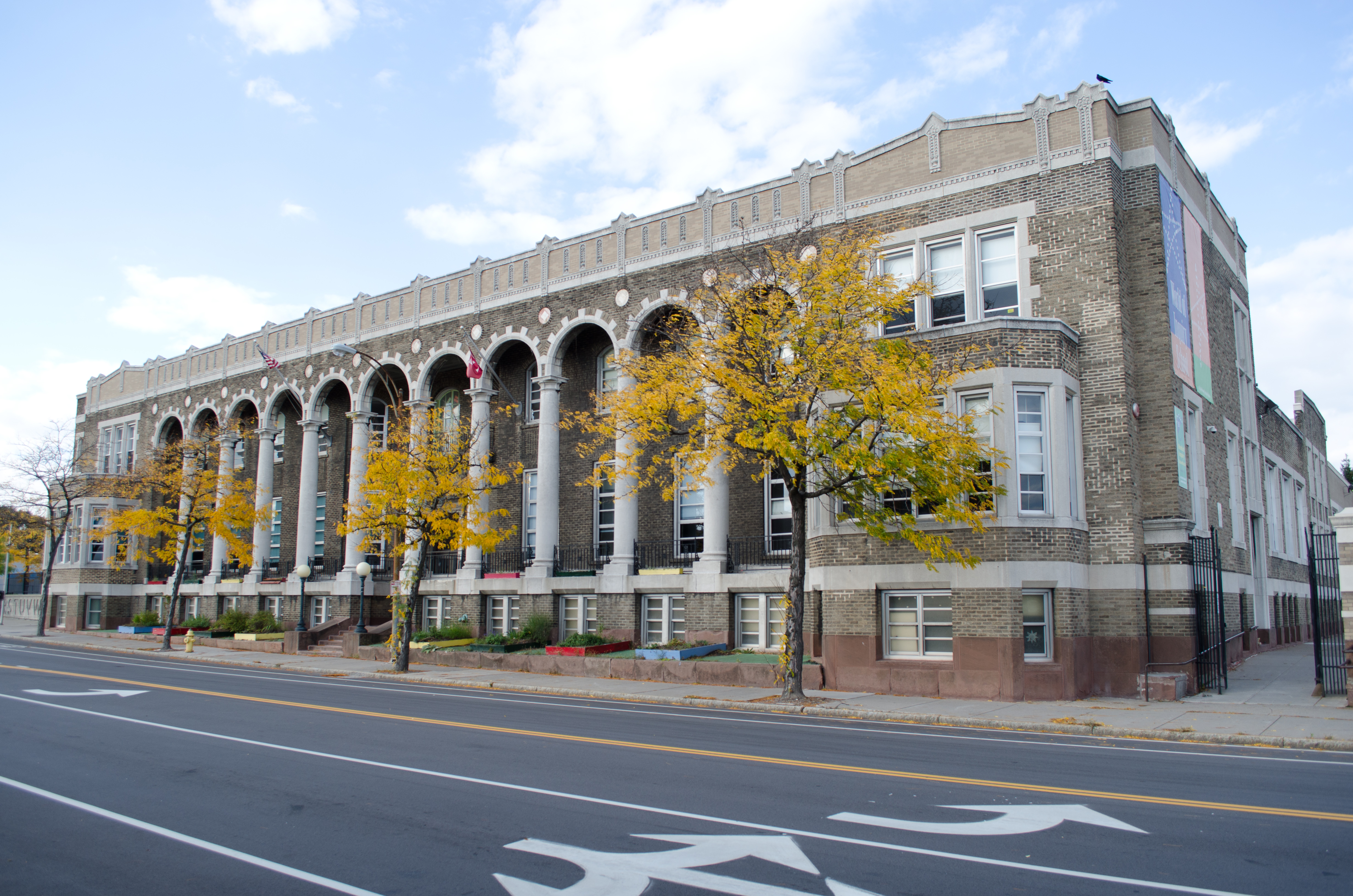
- Chester Dewey School. October 2012

- Location within New York Location within the United States
- Location: 200 University Ave., Rochester, New York
- Coordinates: 43°9′35″N 77°35′51″W
- Area: less than one acre
- Built: 1915
- Architect: Gordon, Edwin
- Architectural style: Renaissance, Italian Renaissance
- MPS: Inner Loop MRA
- NRHP reference No.: 85002847
- Added to NRHP: October 04, 1985

Chester Dewey School No. 14 is a historic school building located at Rochester in Monroe County, New York. It was constructed in 1915-1916 and is a two-story, brown brick structure. The eclectic design freely combines elements and details inspired by the Italian Renaissance, including its eleven bay loggia.

It was listed on the National Register of Historic Places in 1985.

The building is currently home to World of Inquiry School No. 58, a K–12 school.

== Gallery ==
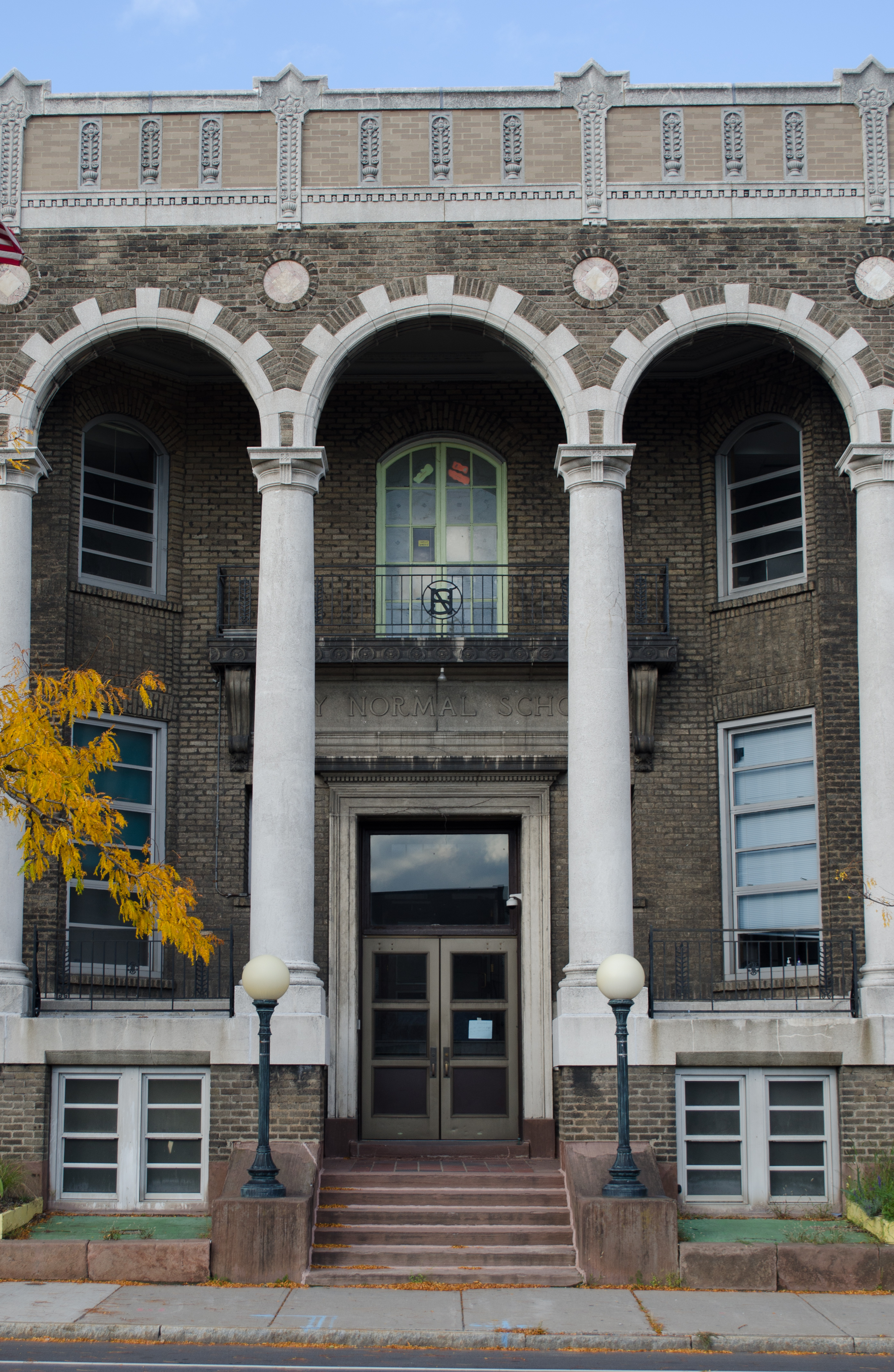
Detail of the school entrance

== See also ==
- National Register of Historic Places listings in Rochester, New York
