= Arvine Heights Historic District =

Historic district in New York, United States

- U.S. National Register of Historic Places
- U.S. Historic district
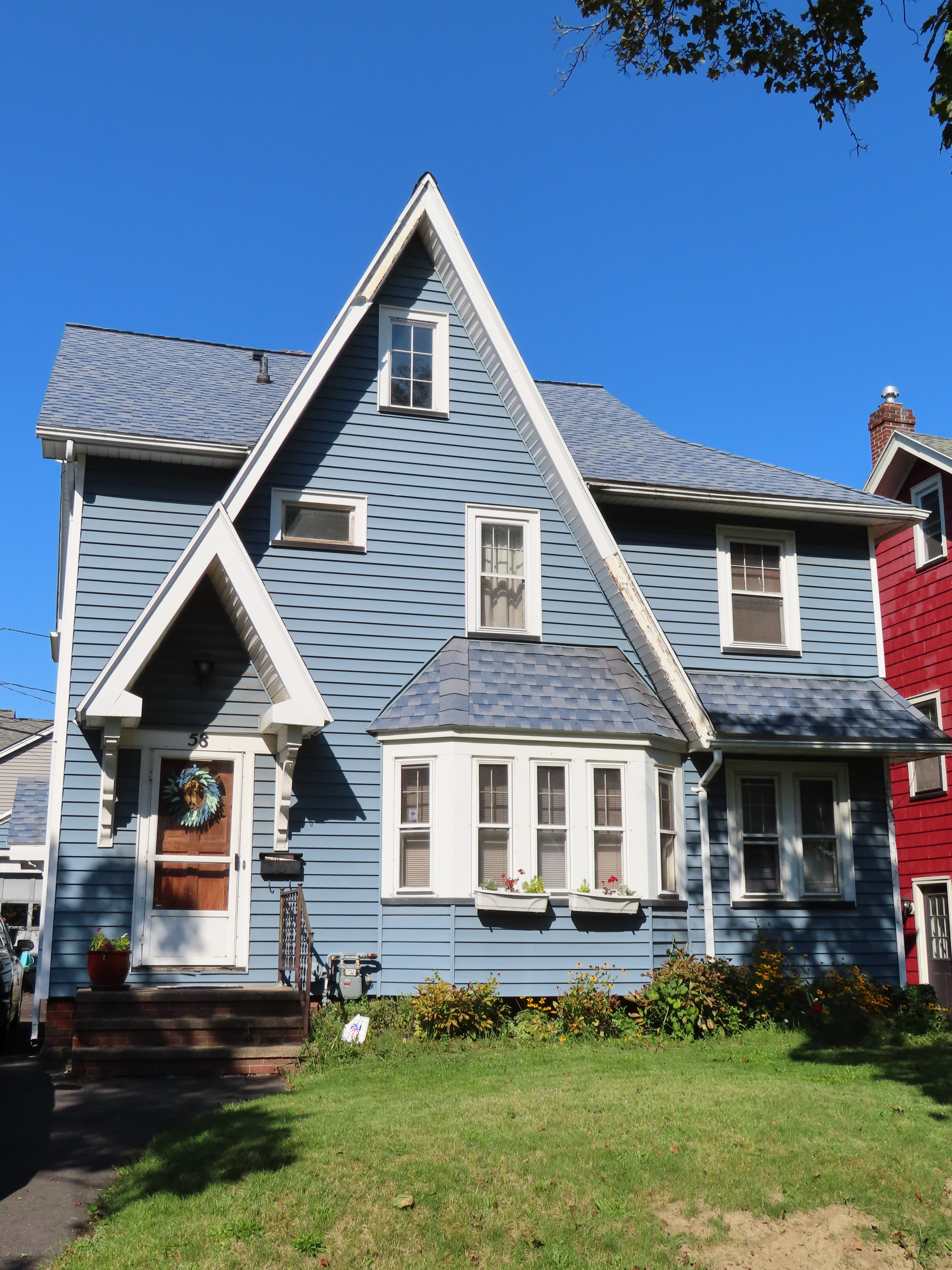

- Location within New York Location within the United States
- Location: 15–120 Arvine Heights, Rochester, New York
- Coordinates: 43°07′35″N 77°38′21″W
- Area: 4.4 acres (1.8 ha)
- Built: c. 1920-1942
- Built by: Homer J. French
- Architectural style: Colonial Revival, Tudor Revival, Bungalow/Craftsman
- NRHP reference No.: 15000310
- Added to NRHP: June 1, 2015

Arvine Heights Historic District is a national historic district located at Rochester, Monroe County, New York. The district encompasses 61 contributing buildings (37 residences) in an exclusively residential section of Rochester. The district developed between about 1920 and 1942, and includes residential buildings in a variety of architectural styles including Colonial Revival, Tudor Revival, and Bungalow / American Craftsman. The dwellings reflect modest designs directed toward a middle-class clientele in a newly developing area of Rochester's Nineteenth Ward.

It was listed on the National Register of Historic Places in 2015.

== See also ==
- National Register of Historic Places listings in Rochester, New York
