= Adam Brown Block =

Historic commercial building in New York, United States

- U.S. National Register of Historic Places
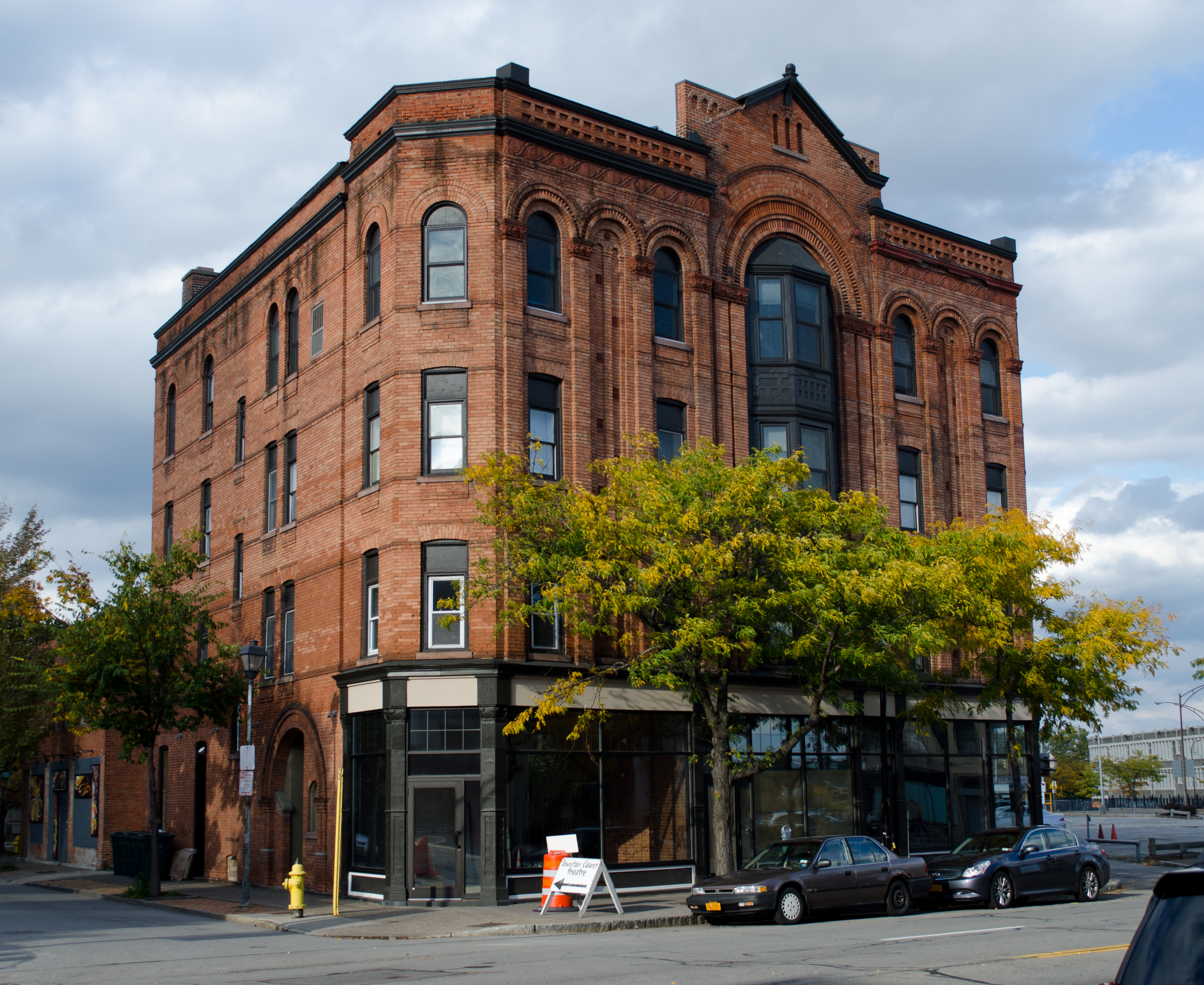
- Adam Brown Block, October 2012

- Location within New York Location within the United States
- Location: 480 E. Main St., Rochester, New York
- Coordinates: 43°9′31″N 77°35′59″W
- Area: less than one acre
- Built: 1885
- Architect: Ellis, Harvey
- Architectural style: Romanesque
- MPS: Inner Loop MRA
- NRHP reference No.: 85002857
- Added to NRHP: October 04, 1985

Adam Brown Block is a historic commercial building located at Rochester in Monroe County, New York, United States. It is a four-story brick building with terra cotta trim built in 1885 in the Romanesque Revival style.

It was listed on the National Register of Historic Places in 1985.

== See also ==
- National Register of Historic Places listings in Rochester, New York
