= Cox Building =

Historic commercial building in New York, United States

- U.S. National Register of Historic Places
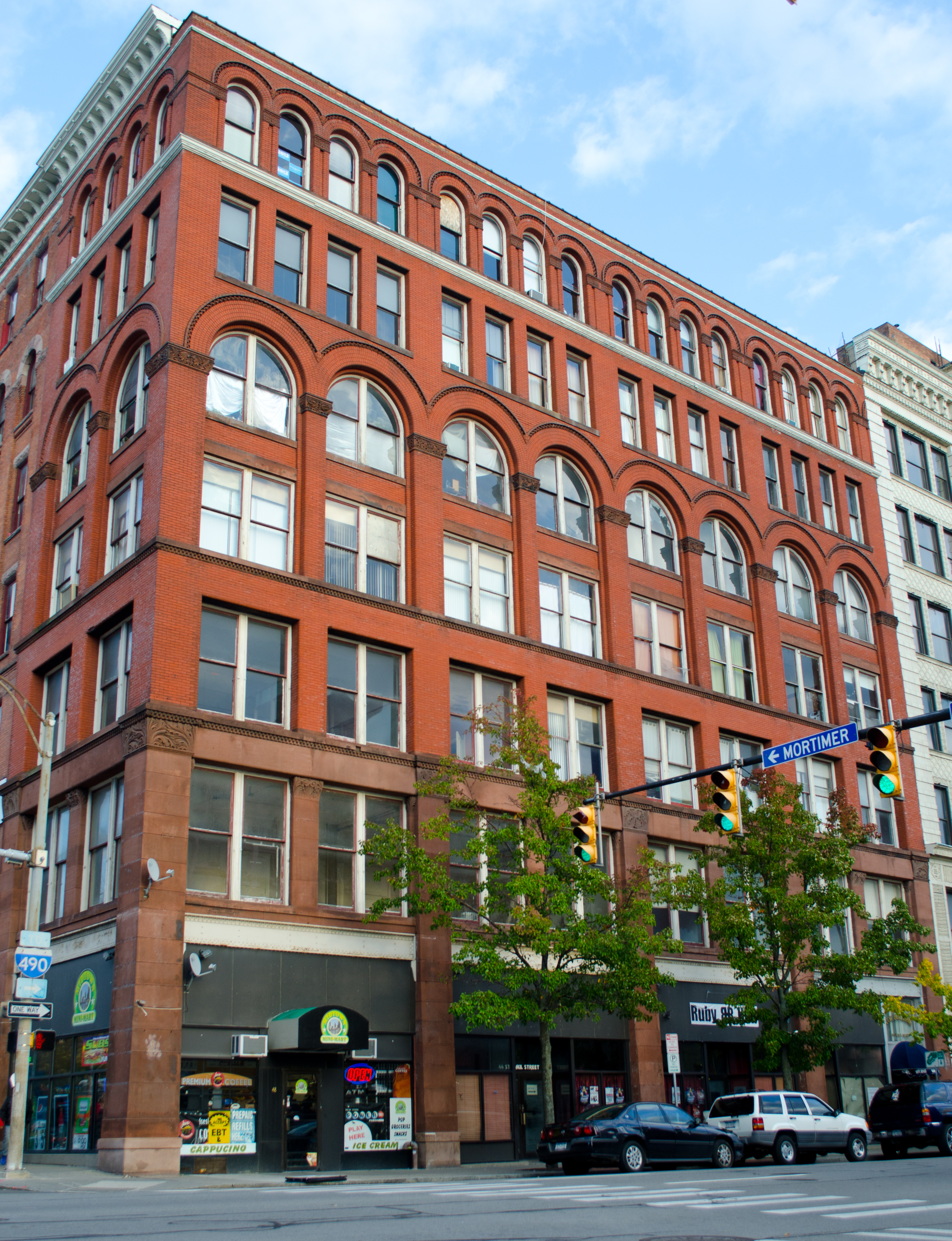
- Cox Building, October 2012

- Location within New York Location within the United States
- Location: 36-48 St. Paul St., Rochester, New York
- Coordinates: 43°9′27″N 77°36′34″W
- Area: less than one acre
- Built: 1888
- Architect: Sibley, Lindsay & Curr
- Architectural style: Romanesque
- MPS: Department Store TR
- NRHP reference No.: 84000279
- Added to NRHP: October 11, 1984

The Cox Building is a historic department store building located at 36-48 St. Paul Street in Rochester, Monroe County, New York.

== Description and history ==
It is a seven-story, red brick and brownstone structure of masonry load bearing construction. It was built in 1888 by architecture firm Sibley, Lindsay & Curr, and is characterized by fine Romanesque style detailing.

It was listed on the National Register of Historic Places on October 11, 1984.

== Gallery ==
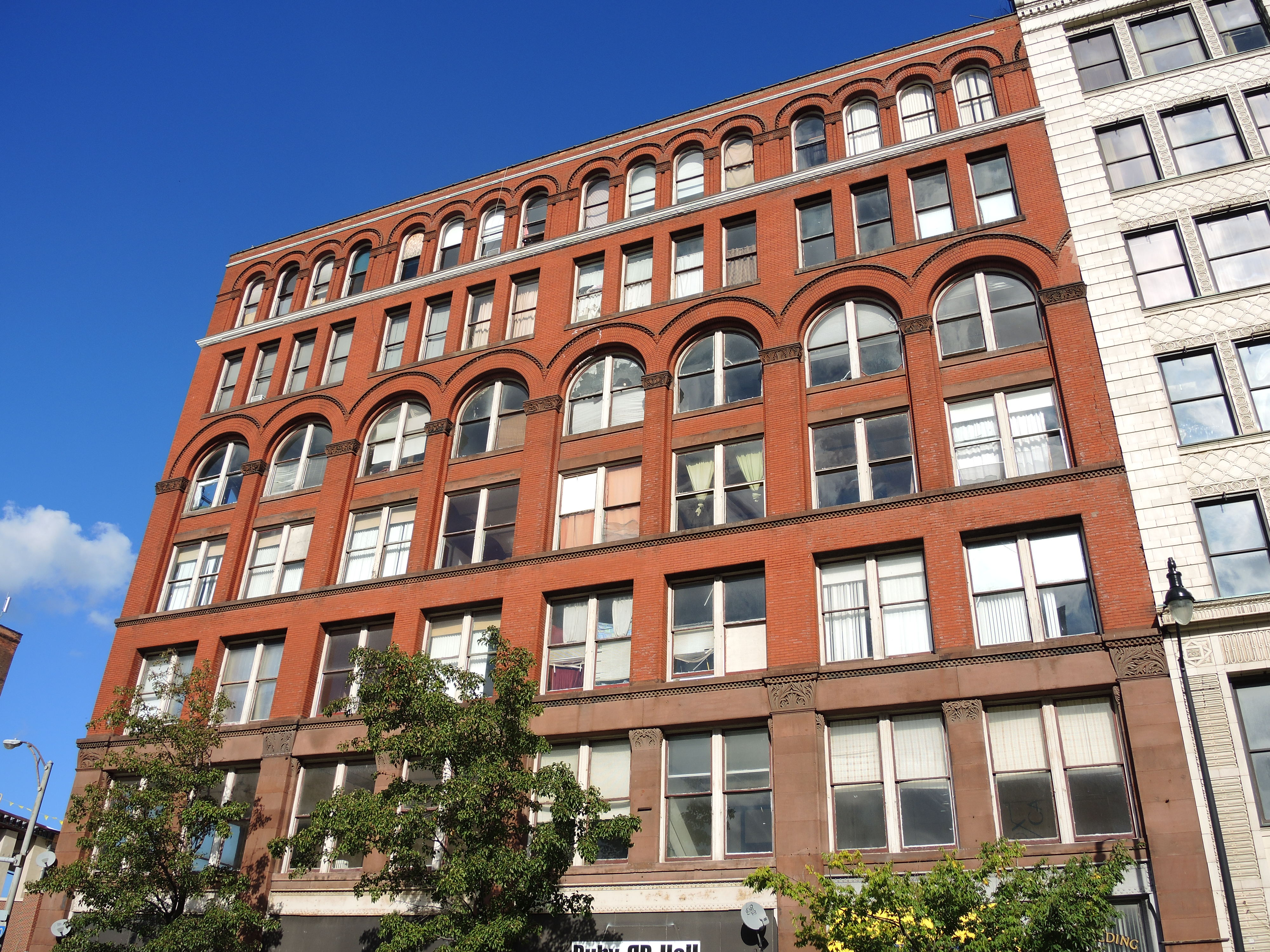

== See also ==
- National Register of Historic Places listings in Rochester, New York
