= Inglewood and Thurston Historic District =

Historic district in New York, United States

- U.S. National Register of Historic Places
- U.S. Historic district
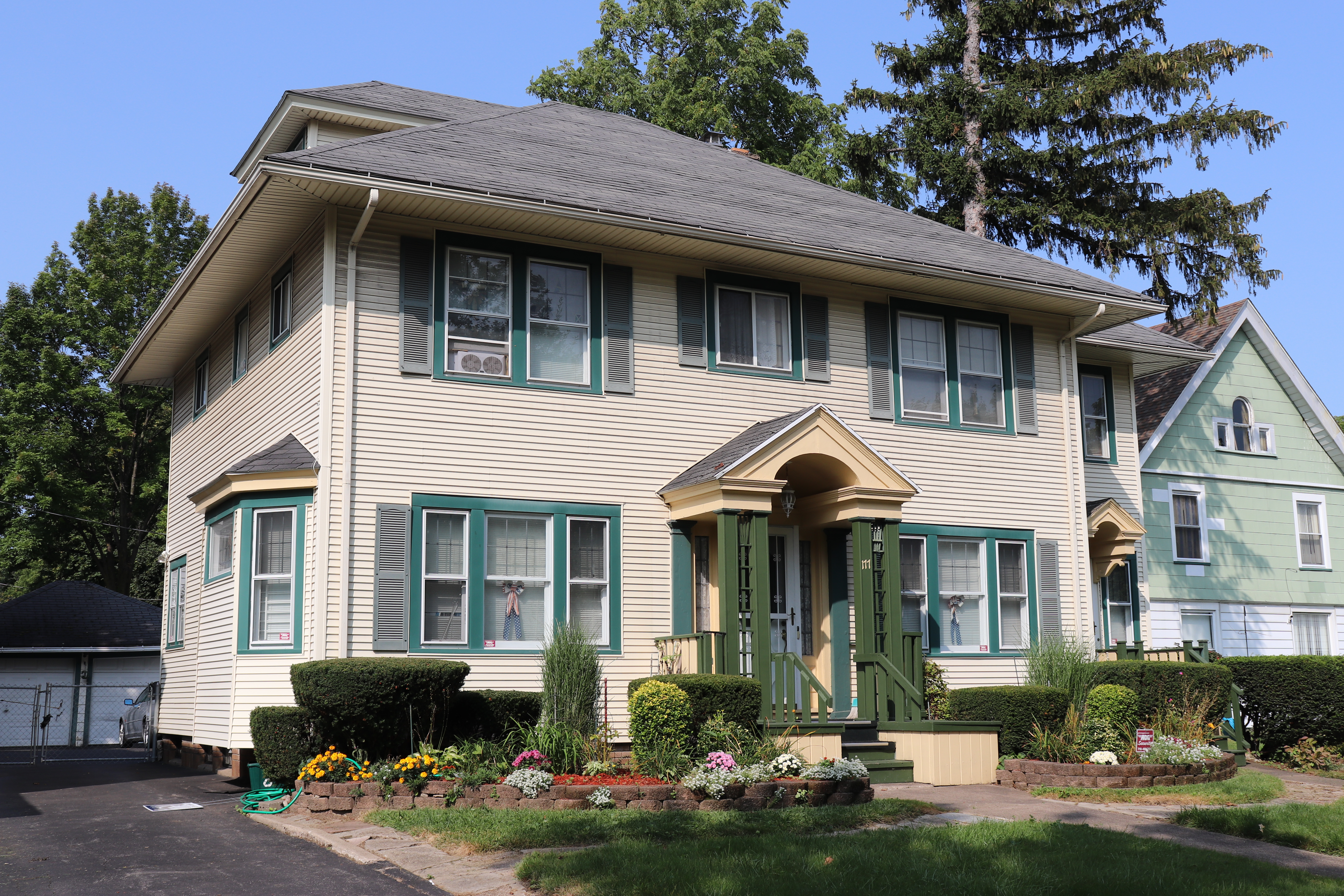
- 177 Thurston Road

- Location within New York Location within the United States
- Location: 15-218 Inglewood Dr., 169-291 Thurston Rd. & 5 Marlborough, Rochester, New York
- Coordinates: 43°08′26″N 77°39′15″W
- Area: 22.48 acres (9.10 ha)
- Built: c. 1920-1927
- Built by: Hillard & Skinner
- Architect: L.A. Cobb
- Architectural style: Colonial Revival, Arts and Crafts, American Foursquare, Tudor Revival
- NRHP reference No.: 15000368
- Added to NRHP: June 30, 2015

Inglewood and Thurston Historic District is a national historic district located at Rochester, Monroe County, New York. The district encompasses 141 contributing buildings (78 primary buildings) in a predominantly residential section of Rochester. The district developed between about 1920 and 1927, and includes buildings in a variety of architectural styles including Colonial Revival, Arts and Crafts, American Foursquare, and Tudor Revival. The dwellings reflect designs directed toward a middle-class clientele in a newly developing area of Rochester's Nineteenth Ward. Located in the district is the former Emmanuel Lutheran Church (now the Ebenezer Baptist Church) and the Rochester Presbyterian Home.

It was listed on the National Register of Historic Places in 2015.

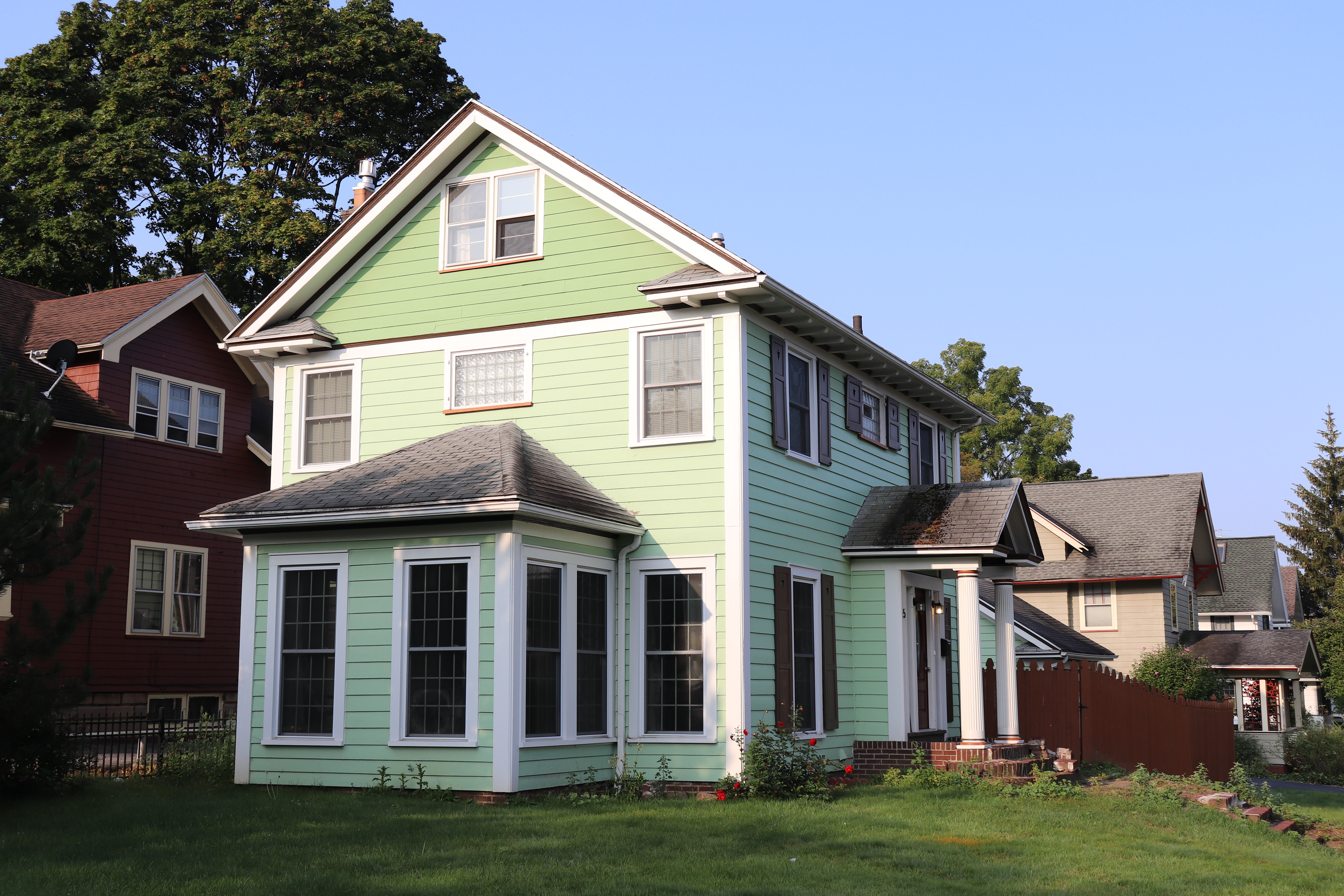
5 Marlborough Road

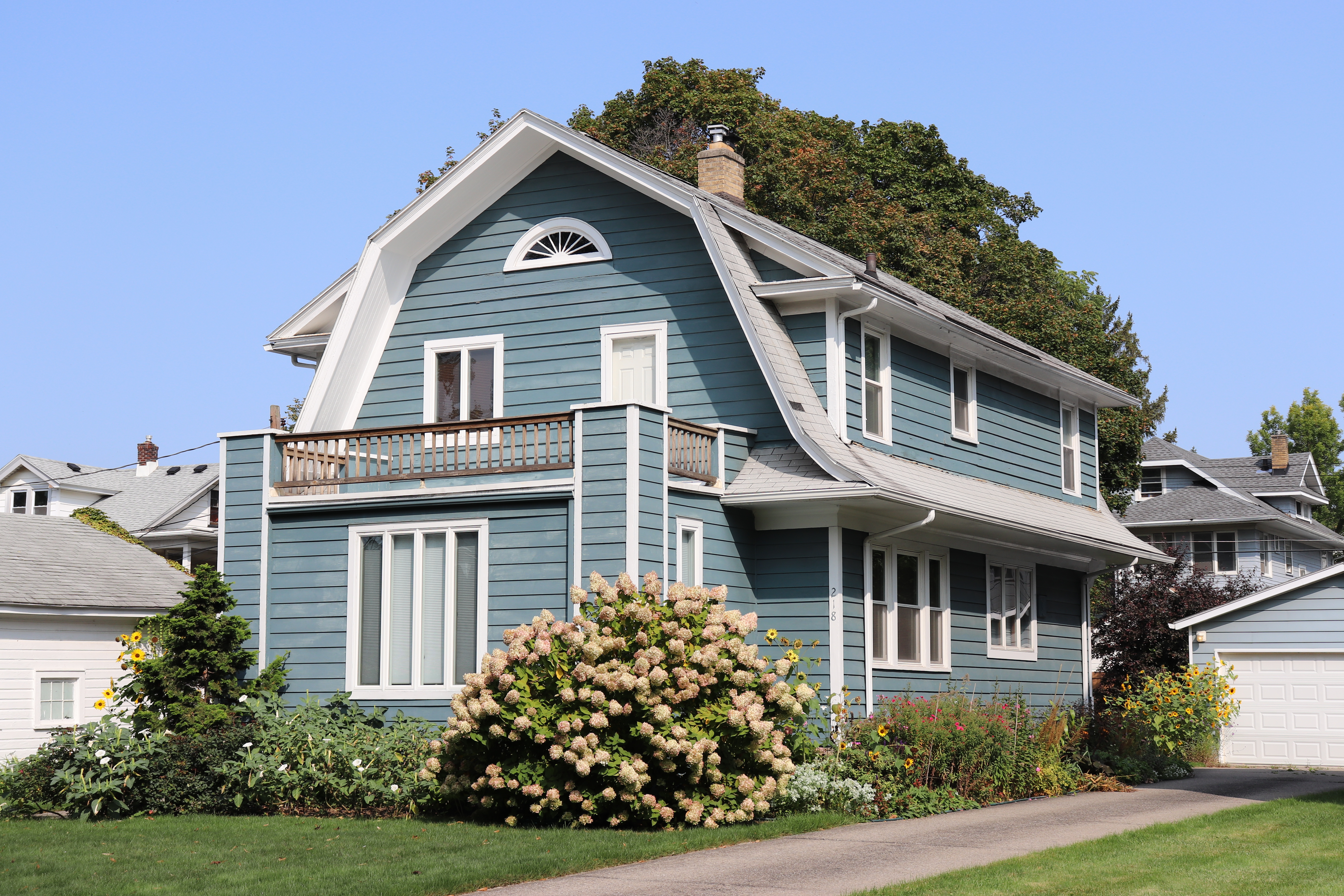
218 Inglewood Drive

== See also ==
- National Register of Historic Places listings in Rochester, New York
