= Pulaski Library =

- U.S. National Register of Historic Places
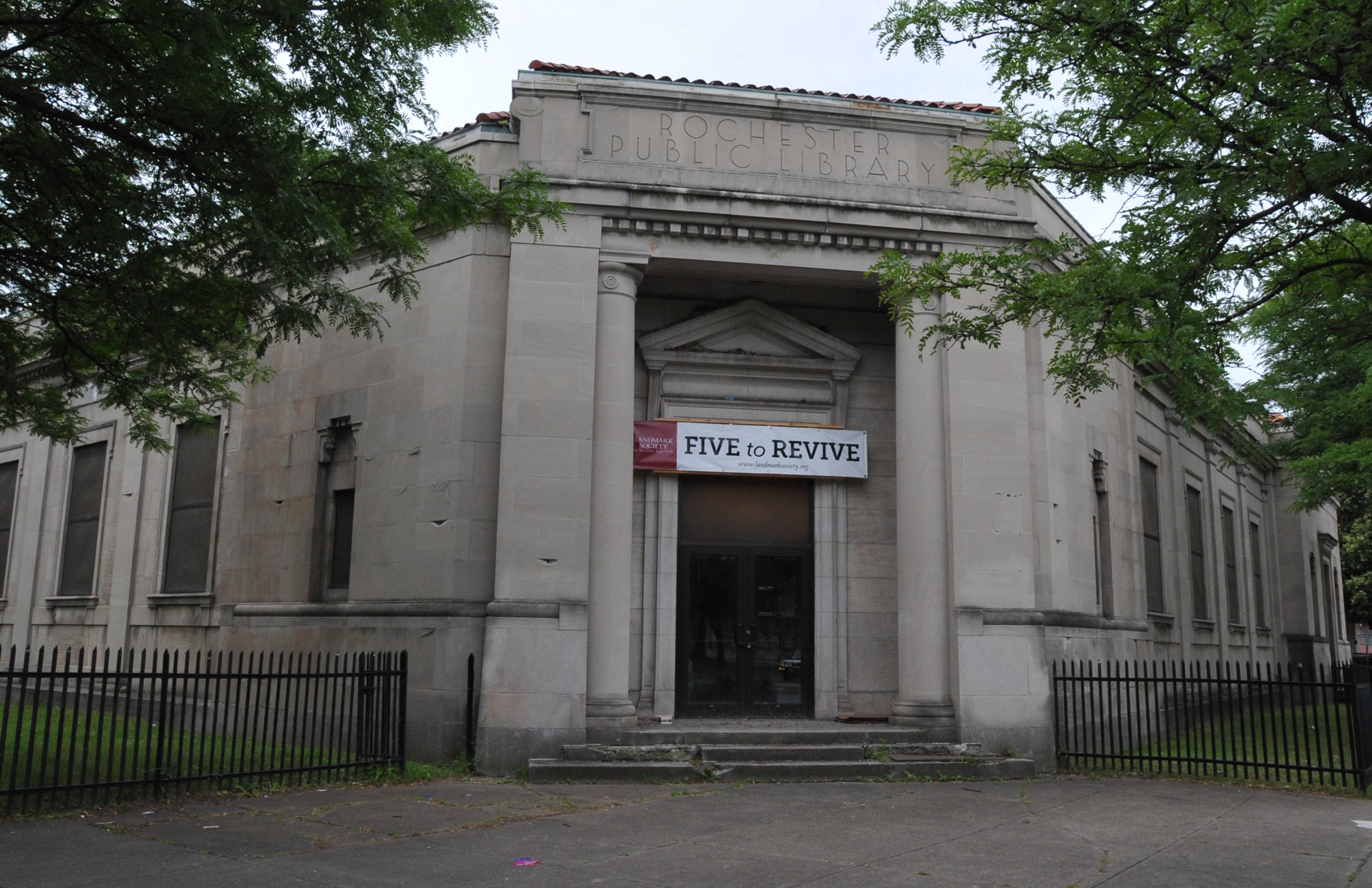
- Pulaski Library, January 2008

- Location within New York Location within the United States
- Location: 1151 Hudson Ave., Rochester, New York
- Coordinates: 43°11′11″N 77°36′0″W
- Area: 0.3 acres (0.12 ha)
- Built: 1931
- Architect: Bohacket & Brew
- Architectural style: Renaissance
- NRHP reference No.: 01001562
- Added to NRHP: February 5, 2002

Pulaski Library, also known as Hudson Branch Library, was a historic library building located at Rochester in Monroe County, New York. It was built in 1931 and was a tall one story building with a full basement and small second story office over the rear entrance foyer. The front entrance portico was flanked by round Doric columns decorated with bosses on the column necks. It was the second permanent library constructed by the City of Rochester. The library was dedicated by the local Polish citizenry to General Casmir Pulaski. It closed in 1994.

It was listed on the National Register of Historic Places in 2002.

The building was damaged in a fire on November 29, 2023 and was demolished on December 1, 2023 citing safety concerns.
