= Ebenezer Watts House =

Historic house in New York, United States

- U.S. National Register of Historic Places
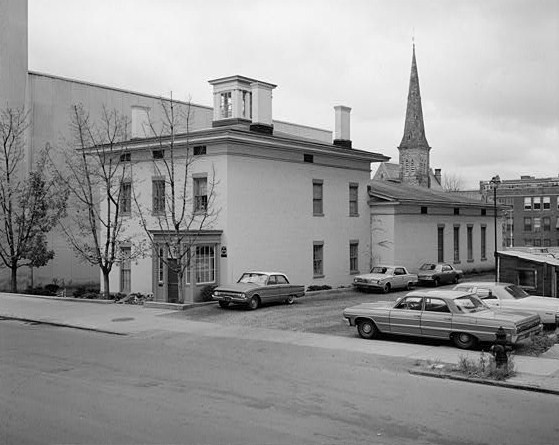
- Ebenezer Watts House, October 1967

- Location within New York Location within the United States
- Location: 47 S. Fitzhugh St., Rochester, New York
- Coordinates: 43°9′13″N 77°36′50″W
- Area: less than one acre
- Built: 1825
- Architectural style: Italianate, Federal
- MPS: Inner Loop MRA
- NRHP reference No.: 85003632
- Added to NRHP: October 18, 1996

Ebenezer Watts House is a historic home located at Rochester in Monroe County, New York. It was built between 1825 and 1827 and remodelled in the 1850s. It is a two-story brick structure with a hipped roof and cupola in the Italianate style. It features a Federal style entrance and interior. It is the oldest surviving residence in downtown Rochester.

It was listed on the National Register of Historic Places in 1996.
