= Shantz Button Factory =

- U.S. National Register of Historic Places
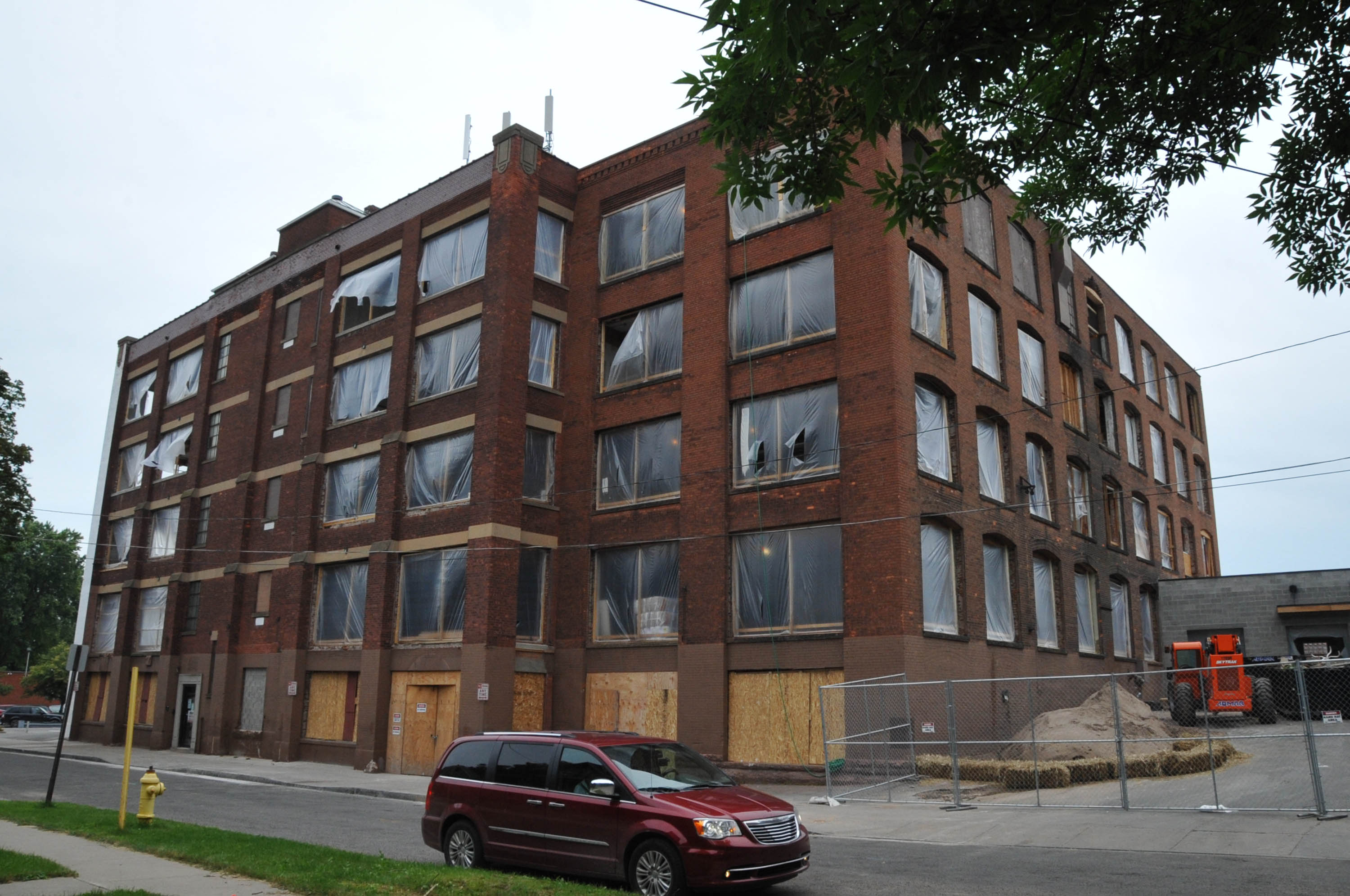
- Shantz Button Factory, January 2008

- Location within New York Location within the United States
- Location: 340 & 330 Rutgers St., 795 Monroe Ave., Rochester, New York
- Coordinates: 43°08′34″N 77°35′25″W
- Area: 1.09 acres (0.44 ha)
- Built: 1903-1904, 1905, 1916, 1920
- NRHP reference No.: 13000600
- Added to NRHP: August 13, 2013

Shantz Button Factory is a historic button factory located in southeast Rochester, Monroe County, New York. The factory consists of three buildings built between 1903 and 1920. The buildings are of heavy timber-frame construction with brick walls, large window openings, flat roofs, and decorative brick cornices. The buildings are five, two, and one stories in height. The button factory closed in the mid-1920s.

It was listed on the National Register of Historic Places in 2013.
