= House at 235–237 Reynolds Street =

Historic house in New York, United States

- U.S. National Register of Historic Places
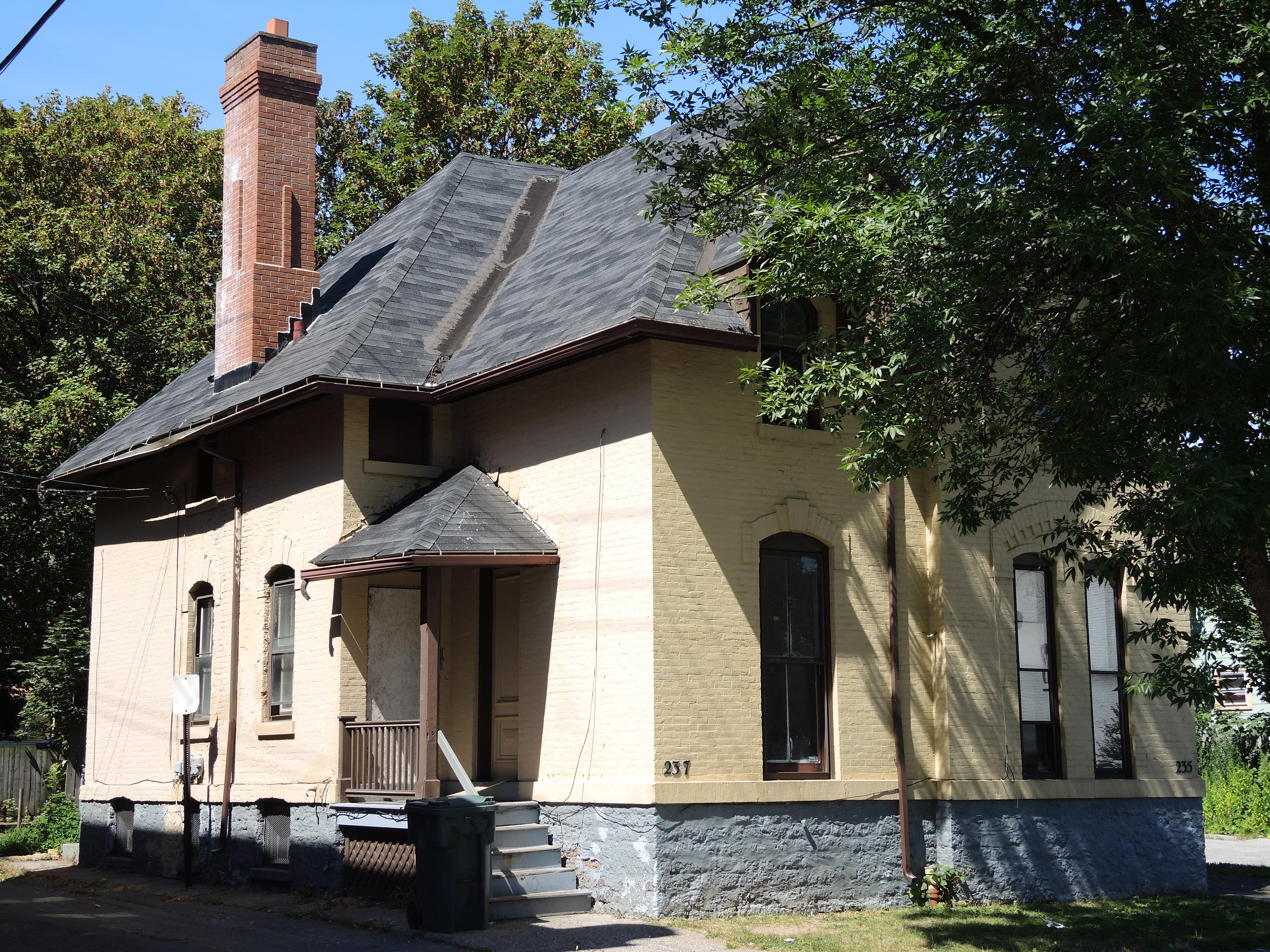

- Location within New York Location within the United States
- Location: 235–237 Reynolds St., Rochester, New York
- Coordinates: 43°8′35″N 77°37′36″W
- Area: less than one acre
- Built: 1880
- Architect: John Abbs
- Architectural style: Gothic Revival
- NRHP reference No.: 85002272
- Added to NRHP: September 12, 1985

The house at 235–237 Reynolds Street is a historic home located at Rochester in Monroe County, New York. It was constructed between 1880 and 1885 as a multi-family dwelling and is an unusual example of High Victorian Gothic style residential architecture in Rochester's Eighth Ward. It is a modestly sized two-bay, two-story brick structure that features asymmetrical massing and verticality and elongation of architectural elements.

It was listed on the National Register of Historic Places in 1985.
