= St. Paul–North Water Streets Historic District =

Historic district in New York, United States

- U.S. National Register of Historic Places
- U.S. Historic district
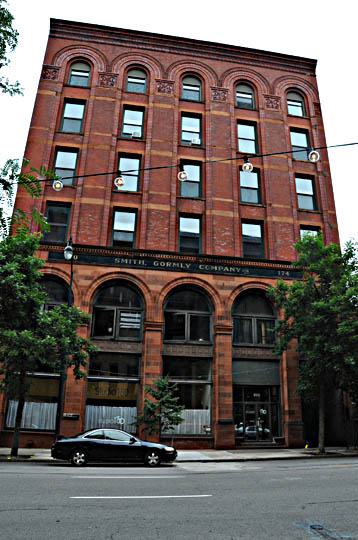
- Smith Gormley Building, January 2008

- Location within New York Location within the United States
- Location: St. Paul, N. Water, and Andrews Sts., Rochester, New York
- Coordinates: 43°9′37″N 77°36′41″W
- Area: less than one acre
- Built: 1880
- Architect: Knebel, Oscar; Ellis & Ellis
- Architectural style: Late 19th And 20th Century Revivals, Romanesque
- MPS: Inner Loop MRA
- NRHP reference No.: 84000398
- Added to NRHP: October 11, 1984

St. Paul–North Water Streets Historic District is a national historic district in Rochester, New York. It consists of a relatively intact cluster of 17 commercial, manufacturing, and warehouse structures.

It was listed on the National Register of Historic Places in 1984.
