= Timothy Wallace House =

Historic house in New York, United States

- U.S. National Register of Historic Places
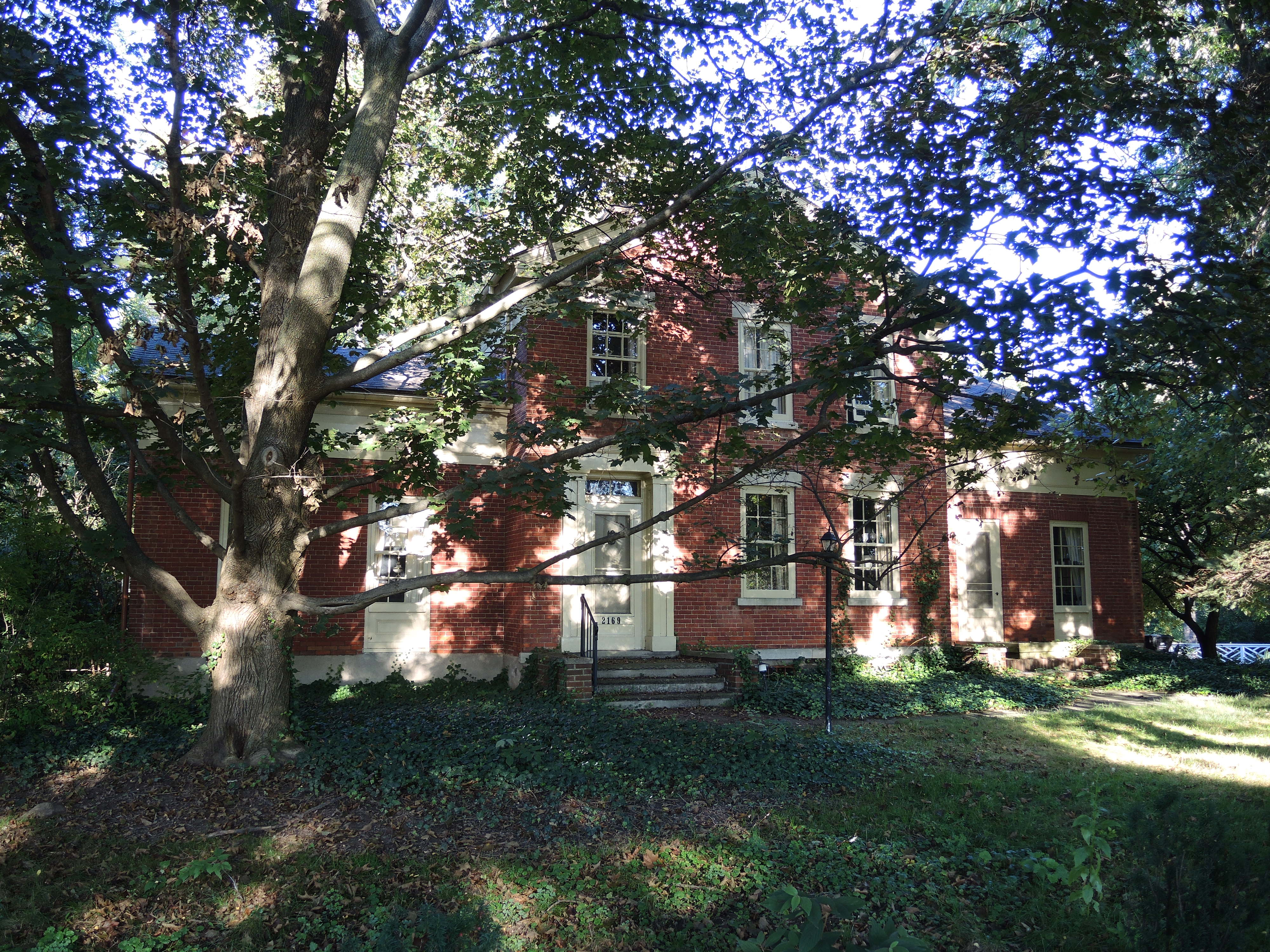
- Timothy Wallace House, September 2013

- Location within New York Location within the United States
- Location: 2169 S. Clinton Ave., Rochester, New York
- Coordinates: 43°6′59″N 77°35′50″W
- Area: 0.4 acres (0.16 ha)
- Built: 1840
- Architectural style: Greek Revival
- NRHP reference No.: 94000004
- Added to NRHP: February 4, 1994

Timothy Wallace House is a historic home located at Rochester in Monroe County, New York. It was constructed about 1840 for farmer Timothy Wallace and is a typical example of a regional farmhouse. It is an intact representative example of vernacular Greek Revival style architecture in Western New York. The original structure featured a two-story main block with flanking wings that was added to and modified throughout the 19th and 20th centuries.

It was listed on the National Register of Historic Places in 1994.
