= David Hagaman House =

Historic house in New York, United States

- U.S. National Register of Historic Places
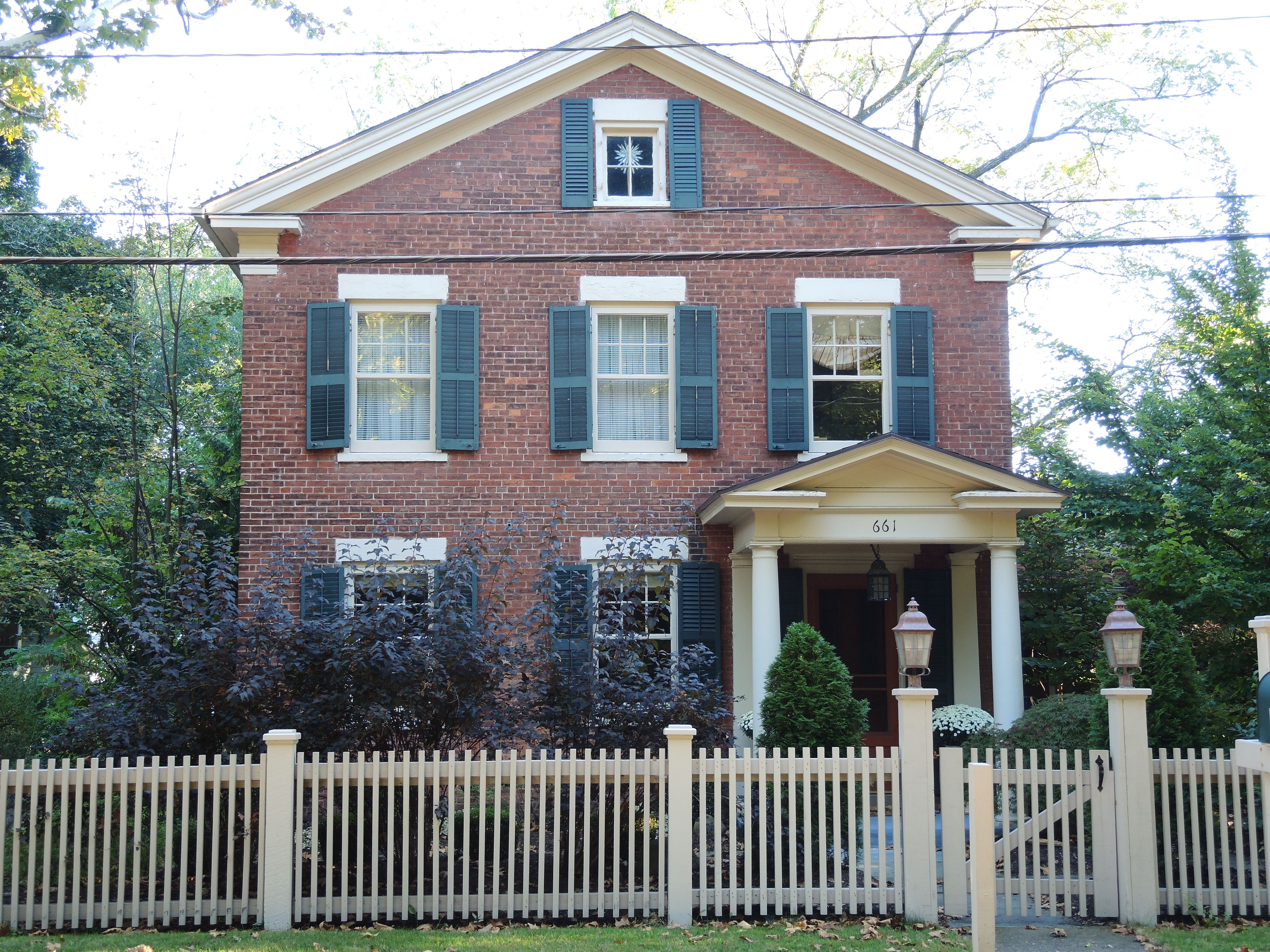

- Location within New York Location within the United States
- Nearest city: Rochester, New York
- Coordinates: 43°7′50″N 77°35′45″W
- Area: less than one acre
- Built: 1840
- Architectural style: Greek Revival
- NRHP reference No.: 94001477
- Added to NRHP: December 23, 1994

David Hagaman House is a historic home located at Rochester in Monroe County, New York. It was constructed about 1840 and is a typical example of vernacular Greek Revival style rural domestic architecture in Western New York. The main block is a 2 1/2-story brick structure with a gable roof.

It was listed on the National Register of Historic Places in 1994.
