= Teoronto Block Historic District =

Historic district in New York, United States

- U.S. National Register of Historic Places
- U.S. Historic district
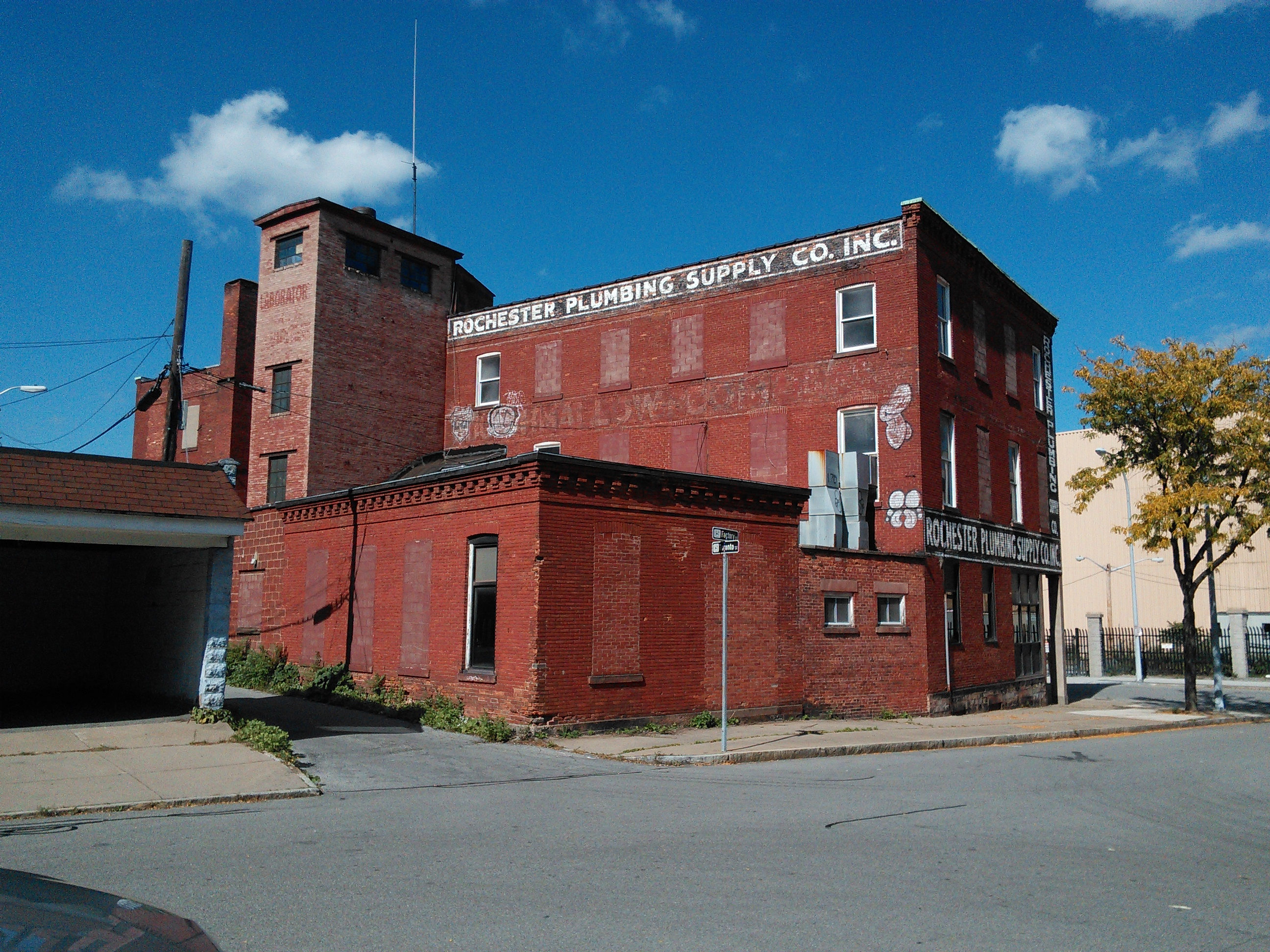

- Location within New York Location within the United States
- Location: Bounded by State, Brown, Factory, and Mill Streets, Rochester, New York
- Coordinates: 43°9′43″N 77°37′9″W
- Area: 1.05 acres (0.42 ha)
- Built: 1844
- NRHP reference No.: 10000798
- Added to NRHP: September 24, 2010

Teoronto Block Historic District is a national historic district located in the Frankfort neighborhood of Rochester in Monroe County, New York. The district consists of 10 contributing buildings originally built beginning in 1844, with later additions and modifications. It is reflective of Rochester's early commercial and industrial development as an Erie Canal-oriented boom town. It includes a block-long group of three-story, brick commercial buildings, known as the Teoronto-Smith Block. They consist of nine five-bay buildings with a continuous gable roof. Also in the district is a set of attached commercial/industrial buildings.

It was listed on the National Register of Historic Places in 2010.
