= Washington Street Rowhouses =

Historic houses in Rochester, New York, United States

- U.S. National Register of Historic Places
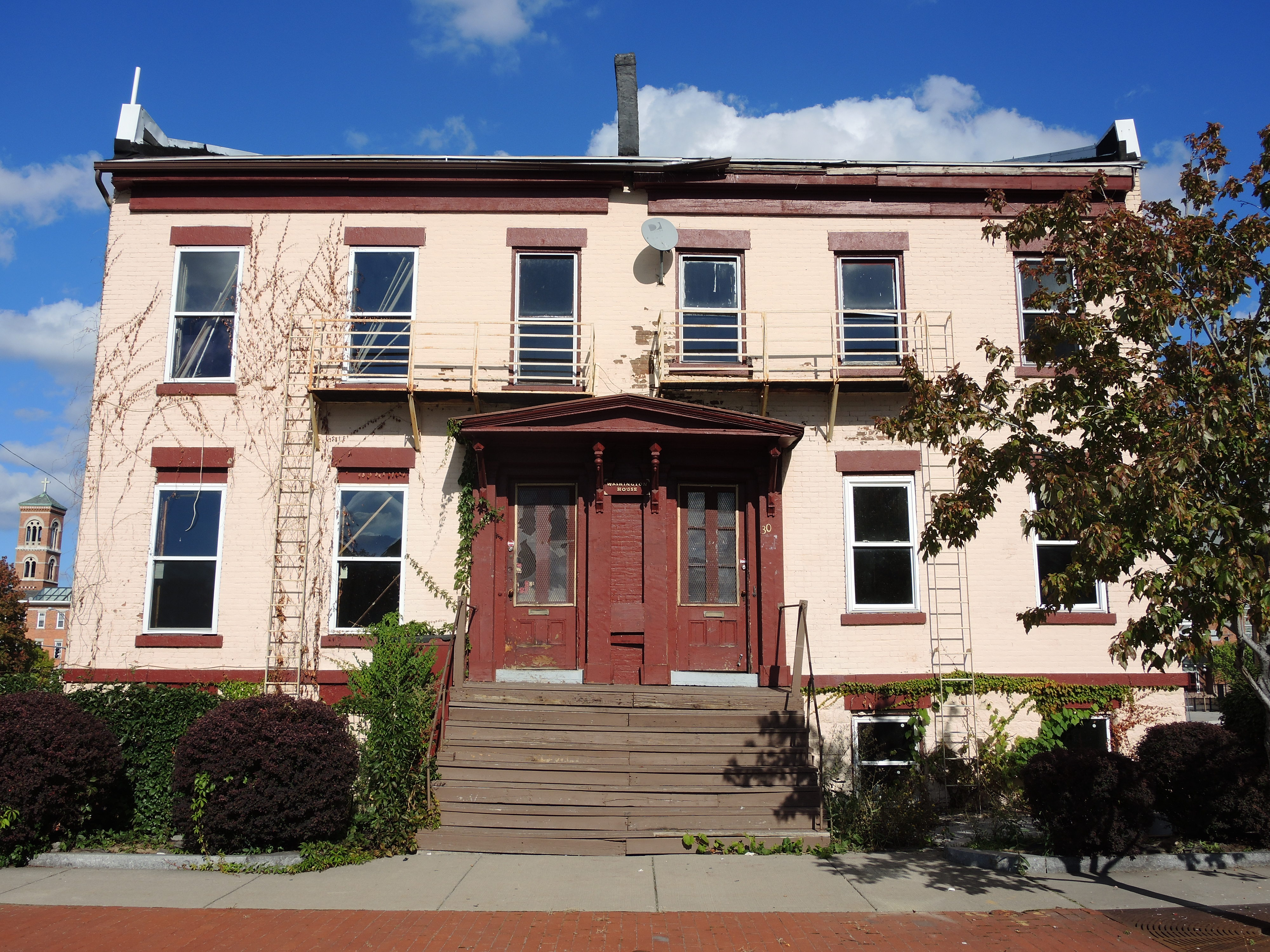
- Washington Street Rowhouses in 2013

- Location within New York Location within the United States
- Location: 30-32 N. Washington St., Rochester, New York
- Coordinates: 43°9′21″N 77°37′4″W
- Built: 1840
- Architectural style: Greek Revival
- MPS: Inner Loop MRA
- NRHP reference No.: 85002856
- Added to NRHP: October 04, 1985

Washington Street Rowhouses are a pair of historic rowhouses located in Rochester in Monroe County, New York. The two-story, three-bay, brick row houses were built about 1840 in the Greek Revival style. They have pitched roofs, interior end chimneys, applied wooden cornices, and side by side entrances that adjoin the party wall.

They were listed on the National Register of Historic Places in 1985.
