= Edwards Building =

Historic commercial building in New York, United States

- U.S. National Register of Historic Places
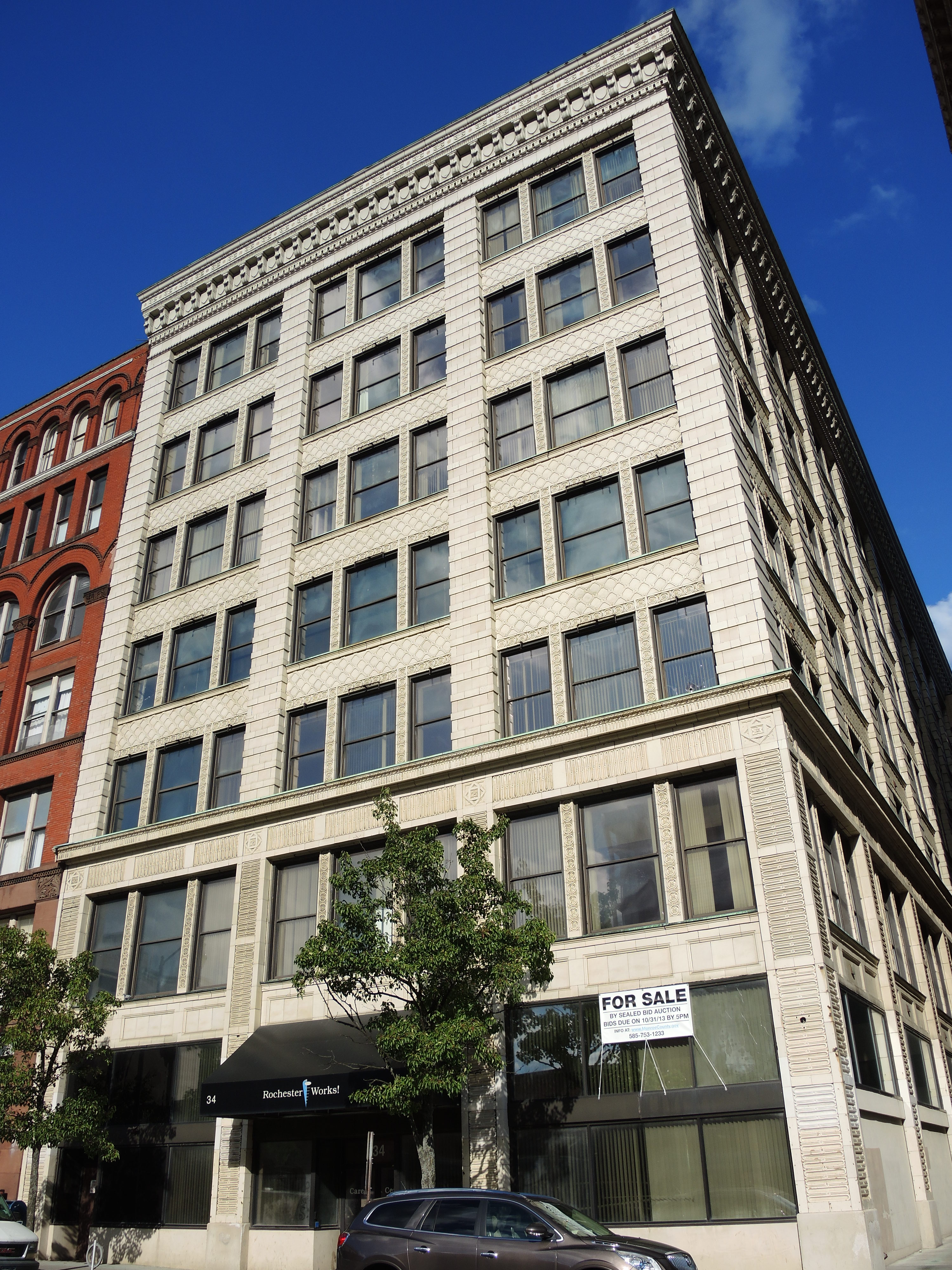
- Edwards Building, September 2013

- Location within New York Location within the United States
- Location: 26-34 St. Paul St., Rochester, New York
- Coordinates: 43°9′26″N 77°36′33″W
- Area: less than one acre
- Built: 1908
- Architect: Crandall & Strobel; Edwards Department Store
- Architectural style: Renaissance
- MPS: Department Store TR
- NRHP reference No.: 84000287
- Added to NRHP: October 11, 1984

Edwards Building is a historic department store building located at Rochester in Monroe County, New York. It is a seven-story building built in 1908 in the Renaissance Revival style. The building is elaborately clad in white terra cotta and features Chicago style windows. It was built to house the Edward's Department Store.

It was listed on the National Register of Historic Places in 1984.
