= Jewish Young Men's and Women's Association =

- U.S. National Register of Historic Places
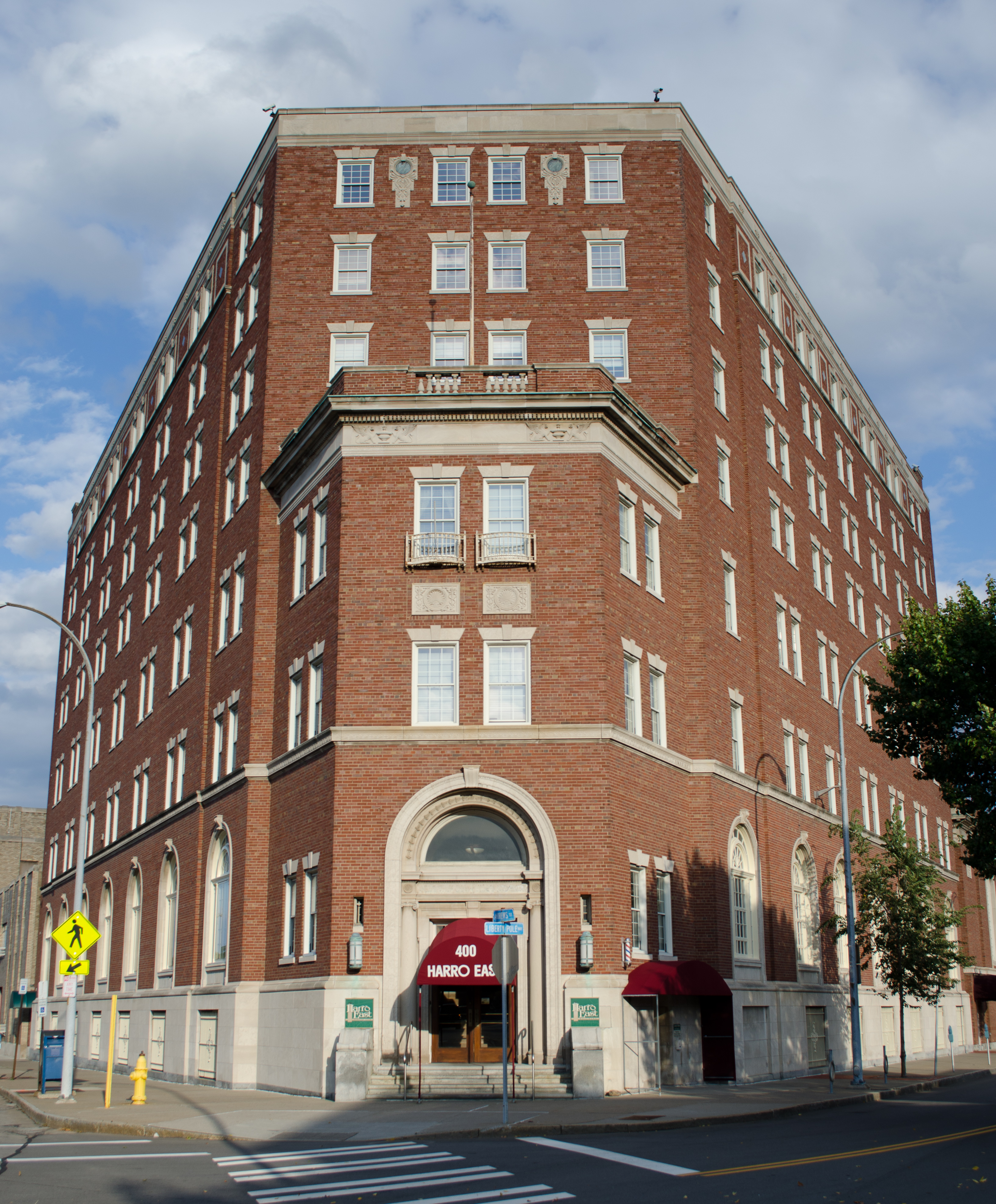
- Jewish Young Men's and Women's Association, October 2012

- Location within New York Location within the United States
- Location: 400 Andrews St., Rochester, New York
- Coordinates: 43°9′37″N 77°36′16″W
- Area: less than one acre
- Built: 1931
- Architect: Firestone, Siegmund; Friedfich, A.,& Sons Co.
- Architectural style: Colonial Revival, Georgian Revival
- MPS: Inner Loop MRA
- NRHP reference No.: 85002848
- Added to NRHP: October 04, 1985

Jewish Young Men's and Women's Association is a historic Jewish community center building located at Rochester in Monroe County, New York. It was constructed in 1931–1935 and is a complex of three connected buildings: an administration building, an auditorium / theater, and a handball court building. The buildings are of steel frame and reinforced concrete construction with exterior walls of brick veneer. The buildings feature Colonial Revival style details.

It was listed on the National Register of Historic Places in 1985.
