= George J. Michelsen Furniture Factory =

Historic place in New York, United States

- U.S. National Register of Historic Places
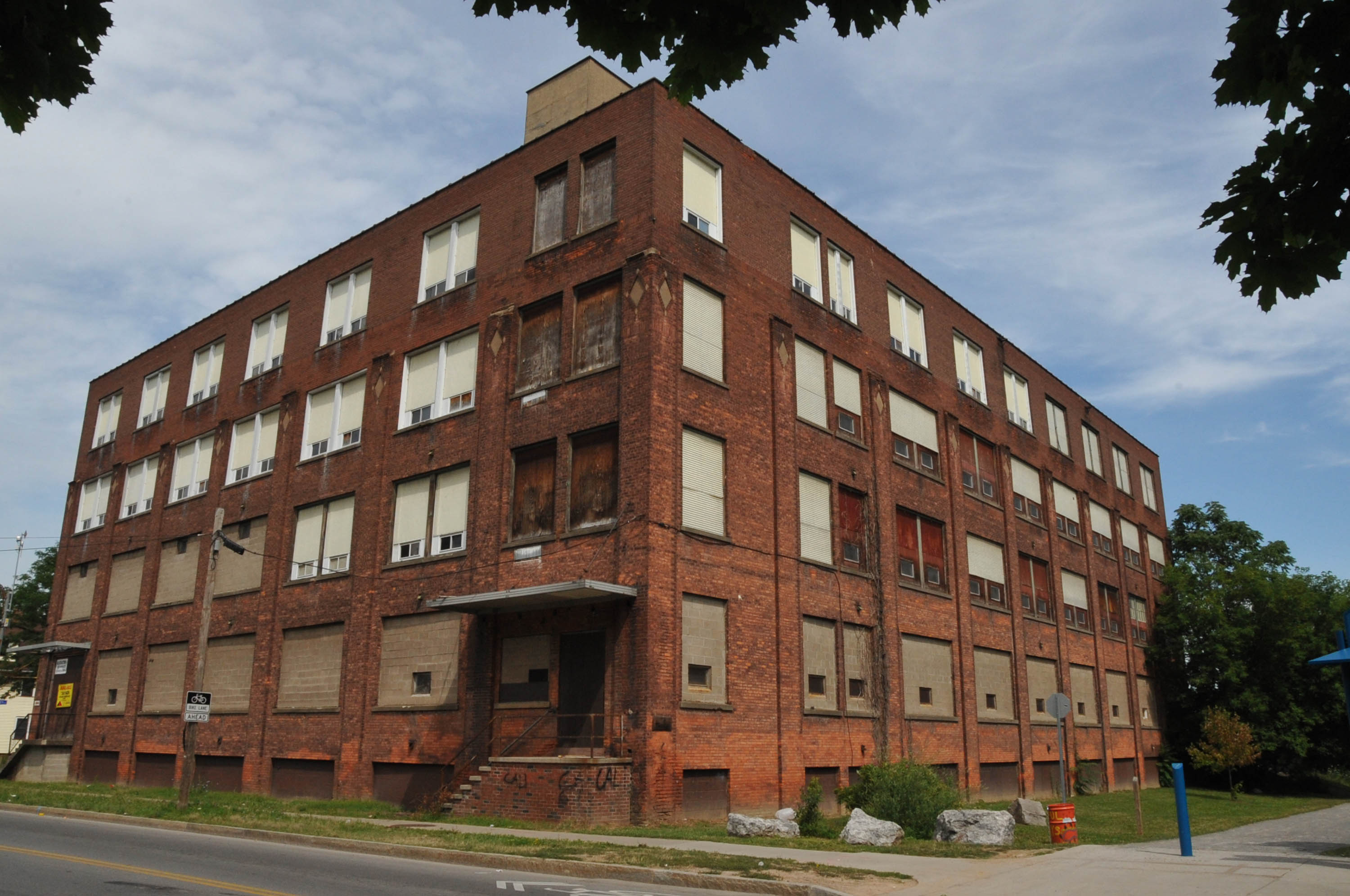
- George J. Michelsen Furniture Factory, January 2008

- Location within New York Location within the United States
- Location: 182 Avenue D, Rochester, New York
- Coordinates: 43°10′49″N 77°37′11″W
- Area: Less than 1 acre (0.40 ha)
- Built: 1914
- Architect: Tyler, James R.
- Architectural style: Early 20th Century Commercial Style
- NRHP reference No.: 12000328
- Added to NRHP: June 6, 2012

George J. Michelsen Furniture Factory is a historic factory located in the north-central neighborhood of Rochester, Monroe County, New York. It was built in 1914, and is a four-story, L-shaped brick building with a flat roof. It is of heavy timber-frame construction and features large window openings. The building housed a bedroom furniture manufacturing concern until the late-1950s.

It was listed on the National Register of Historic Places in 2012.
