= Mount Hope–Highland Historic District =

National historic district located at Rochester in Monroe County, New York

- Mt. Hope–Highland Historic District
- U.S. National Register of Historic Places
- U.S. Historic district
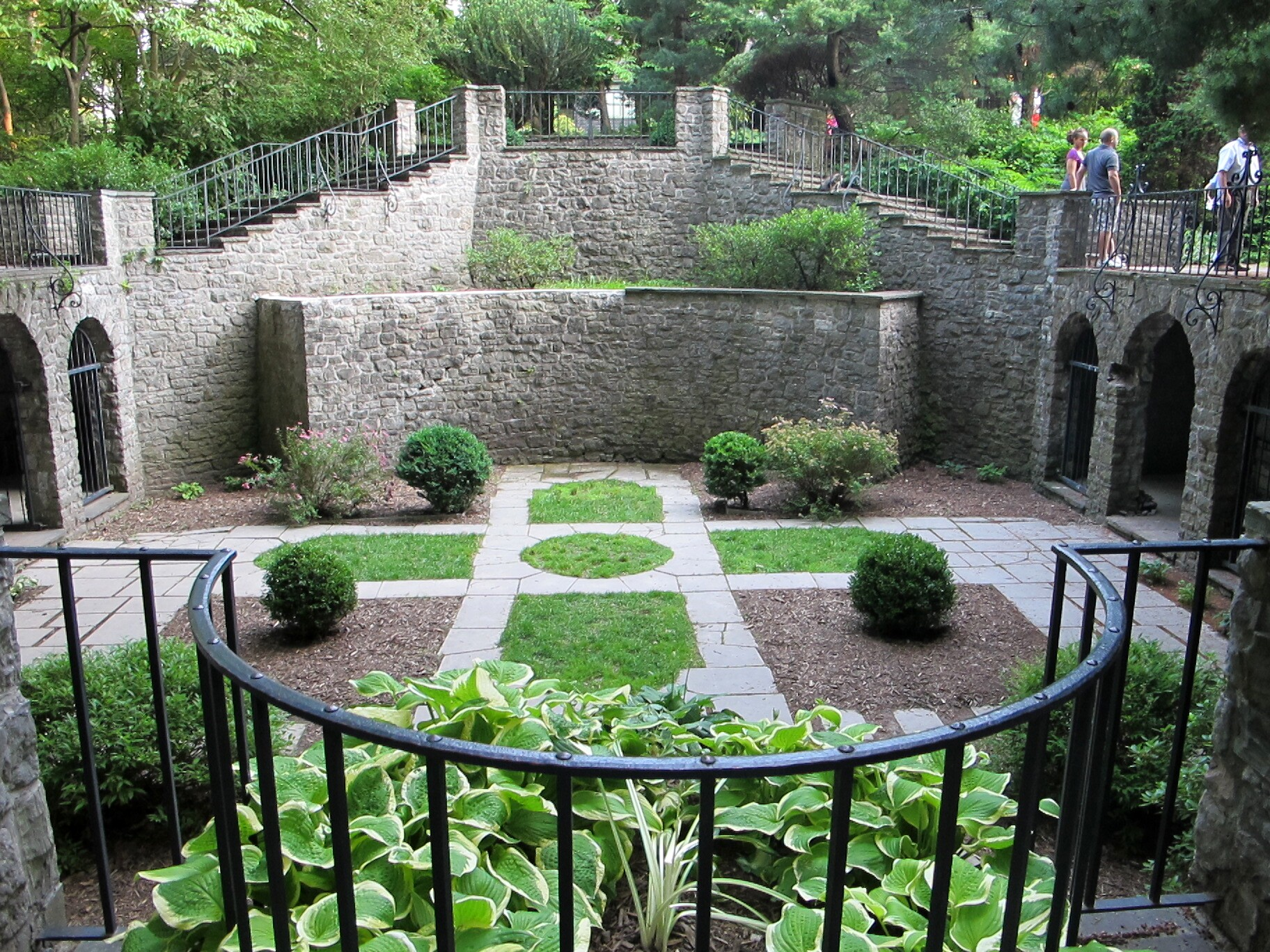
- Sunken Garden at Warner Castle

- Location within New York Location within the United States
- Location: Bounded roughly by the Clarissa St. Bridge, Genesee River, Grove and Mt. Hope Aves., plus, Rochester, New York
- Coordinates: 43°8′9″N 77°36′40″W
- Area: 230 acres (93 ha)
- Architect: Davis, A.J.; Et al.
- Architectural style: Gothic Revival
- NRHP reference No.: 74001261 (original); 100009931 (increase)

Significant dates
- Added to NRHP: January 21, 1974
- Boundary increase: February 20, 2024

Mt. Hope–Highland Historic District is a national historic district located at Rochester in Monroe County, New York. Its encompassed by the neighborhoods of Mount Hope and Highland Park. It has a diverse range of architectural styles. The district was the exclusive domain of the Ellwanger and Barry Botanic Gardens and Mt. Hope Cemetery throughout the mid- and late-19th century. It retains its elegant and spacious character of park land.

== Features ==
The district is punctuated with notable architect-designed buildings combined with more tightly knit early 20th century subdivision along the district's fringes. Among the notable buildings are the Warner Castle (1854), a 22-room mansion that is home to the Rochester Garden Center. The Mt. Hope Cemetery includes a little Gothic chapel designed by Andrew Jackson Warner. The cemetery is also known for its beautiful landscaping and picturesque views.

It was listed on the National Register of Historic Places in 1974, with a boundary increase in 2024.
