= Central Trust Bank Building =

Historic commercial building in New York, United States

- U.S. National Register of Historic Places
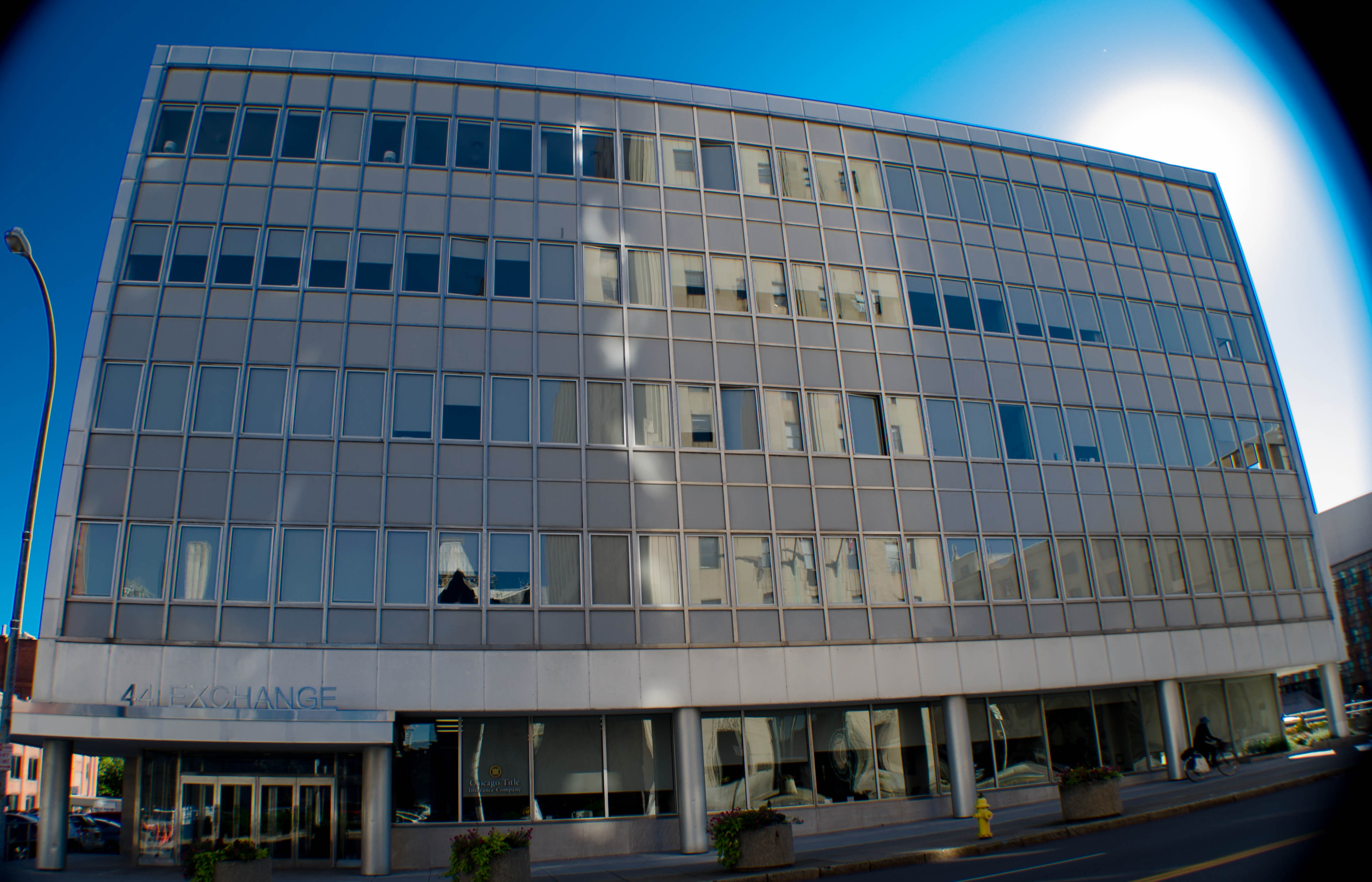
- Central Trust Bank Building, September 2013

- Location within New York Location within the United States
- Location: 44 Exchange Rd., Rochester, New York
- Coordinates: 43°09′18″N 77°36′42″W
- Area: Less than 1 acre (0.40 ha)
- Built: 1959, 1964, 1968
- Built by: Pike Company
- Architect: Traver, Carl, and Starks, Myron
- Architectural style: International Style
- NRHP reference No.: 12000014
- Added to NRHP: February 14, 2012

Central Trust Bank Building is a historic bank building located in downtown Rochester, Monroe County, New York. It was built in 1959, and is a five-story, International Style building with a flat roof. It features a continuous metal and glass curtain wall on the south facade. Originally three-stories, two additional stories were added in 1964. In 1968, a two-story addition along with a sheltered drive-up banking window were added.

It was listed on the National Register of Historic Places in 2012.
