= Building at 551–555 North Goodman Street =

Historic commercial building in New York, United States

- 551–555 North Goodman Street
- U.S. National Register of Historic Places
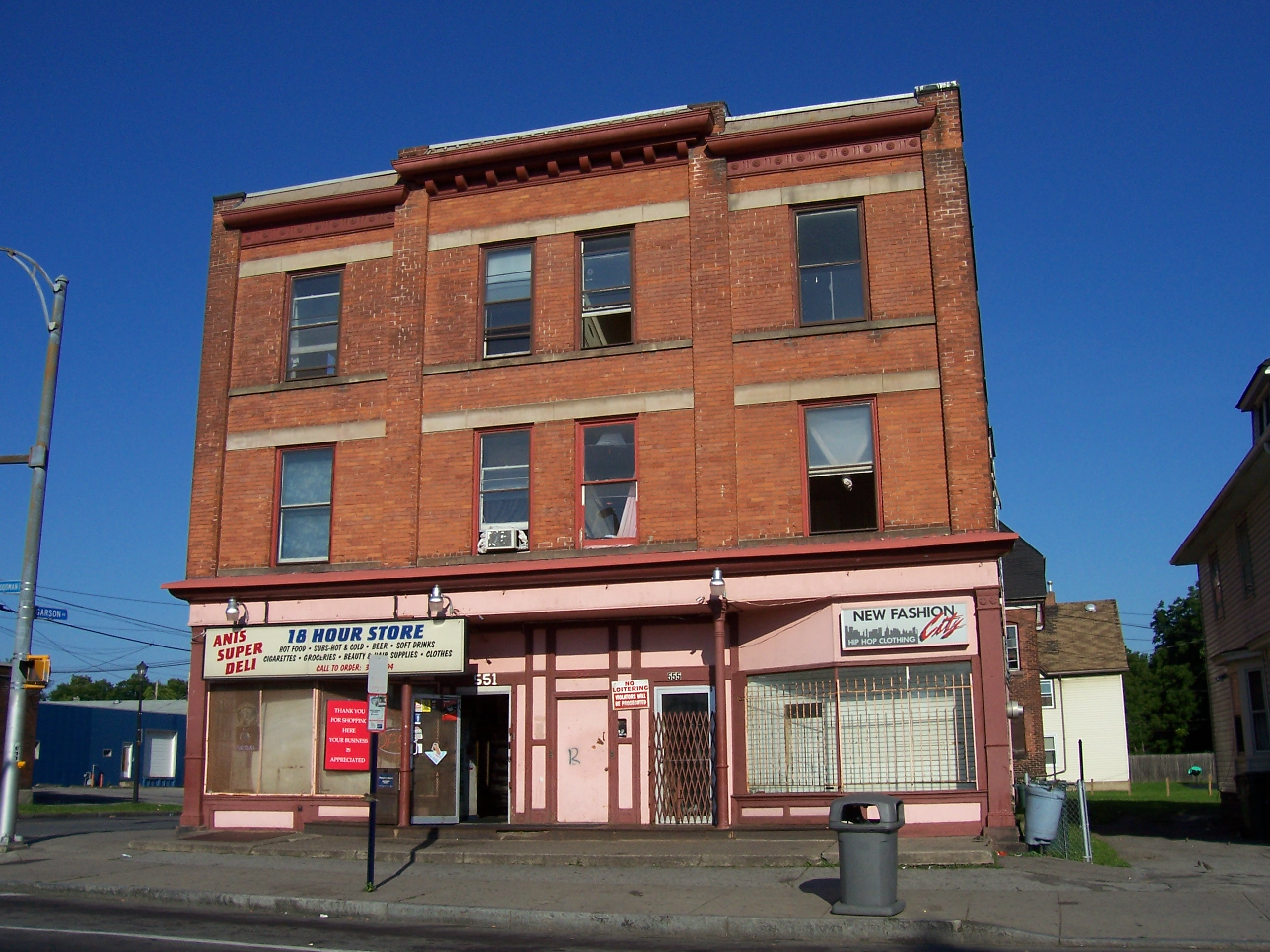

- Location within New York Location within the United States
- Location: 551–555 North Goodman Street, Rochester, New York
- Coordinates: 43°9′50″N 77°35′0″W
- Area: less than one acre
- Built: 1889
- Architectural style: Queen Anne
- NRHP reference No.: 86000448
- Added to NRHP: March 20, 1986

551–555 North Goodman Street is a historic commercial building located in Rochester, Monroe County, New York.

== Description and history ==
The building is a large, four bay wide, three-story masonry building, designed in the Queen Anne style built in 1889.

It was listed on the National Register of Historic Places on March 20, 1986.
