= Bridge Square Historic District =

Historic district in New York, United States

- U.S. National Register of Historic Places
- U.S. Historic district
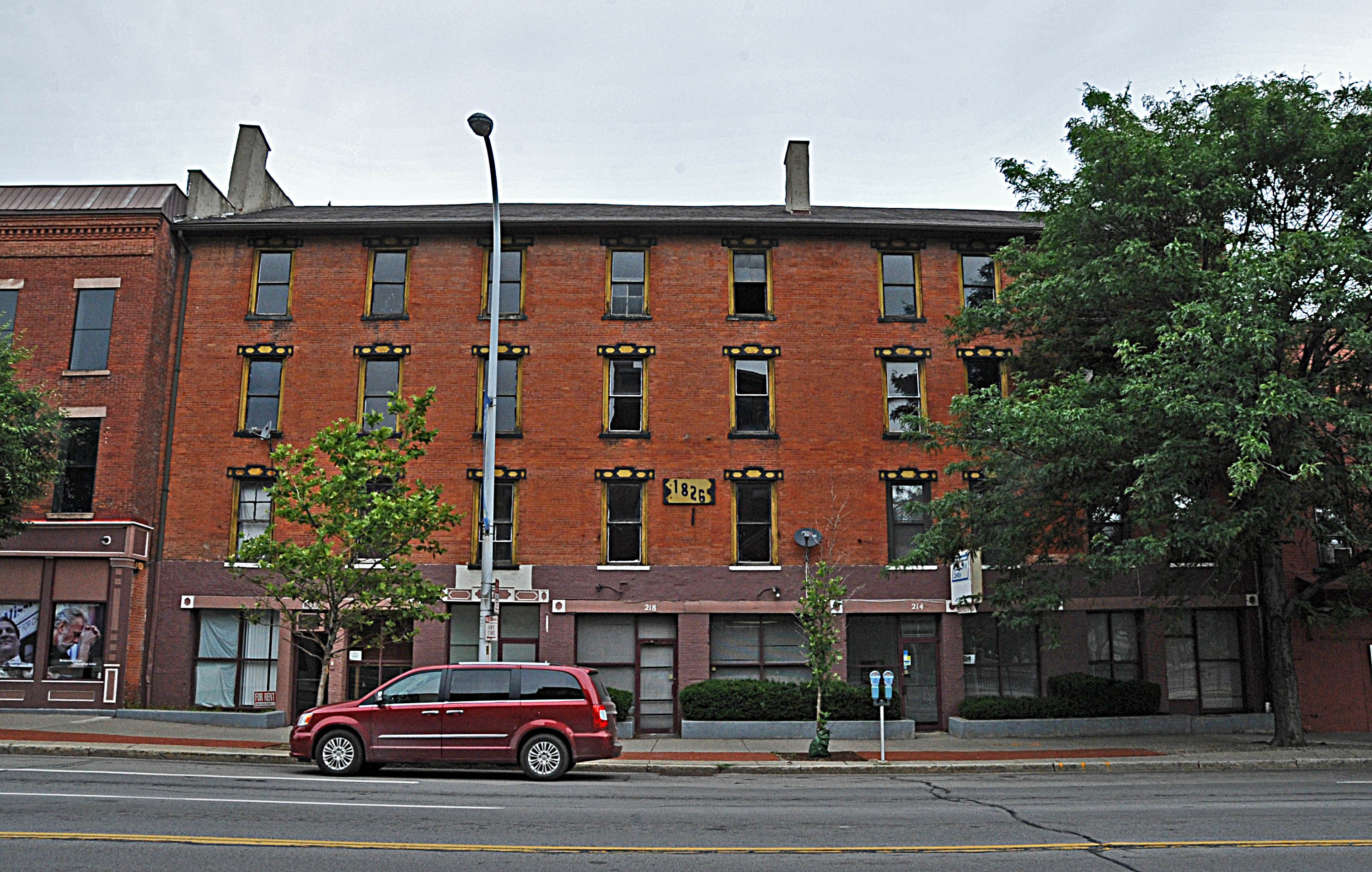
- U.S. Hotel, built in 1826, is the oldest building in the district

- Location within New York Location within the United States
- Location: Roughly bounded by Inner Loop, Centre Park, Washington and W. Main Sts., Rochester, New York
- Coordinates: 43°9′17″N 77°37′8″W
- Area: 10.5 acres (4.2 ha)
- Built: 1826
- Architectural style: Romanesque, Federal
- MPS: Inner Loop MRA
- NRHP reference No.: 84000273
- Added to NRHP: October 11, 1984

Bridge Square Historic District is a national historic district located in the Northwest Quadrant of Rochester in Monroe County, New York. The district contains 24 contributing buildings that consist primarily of two-, three-, and four-story brick masonry commercial and industrial buildings. Structures date from 1826 to 1928, the oldest being the U.S. Hotel (1826), that served as the location of the founding of the University of Rochester and Colgate Divinity School.

It was listed on the National Register of Historic Places in 1984.
