= Vanderbeck House (Rochester, New York) =

Historic house in New York, United States

- U.S. National Register of Historic Places
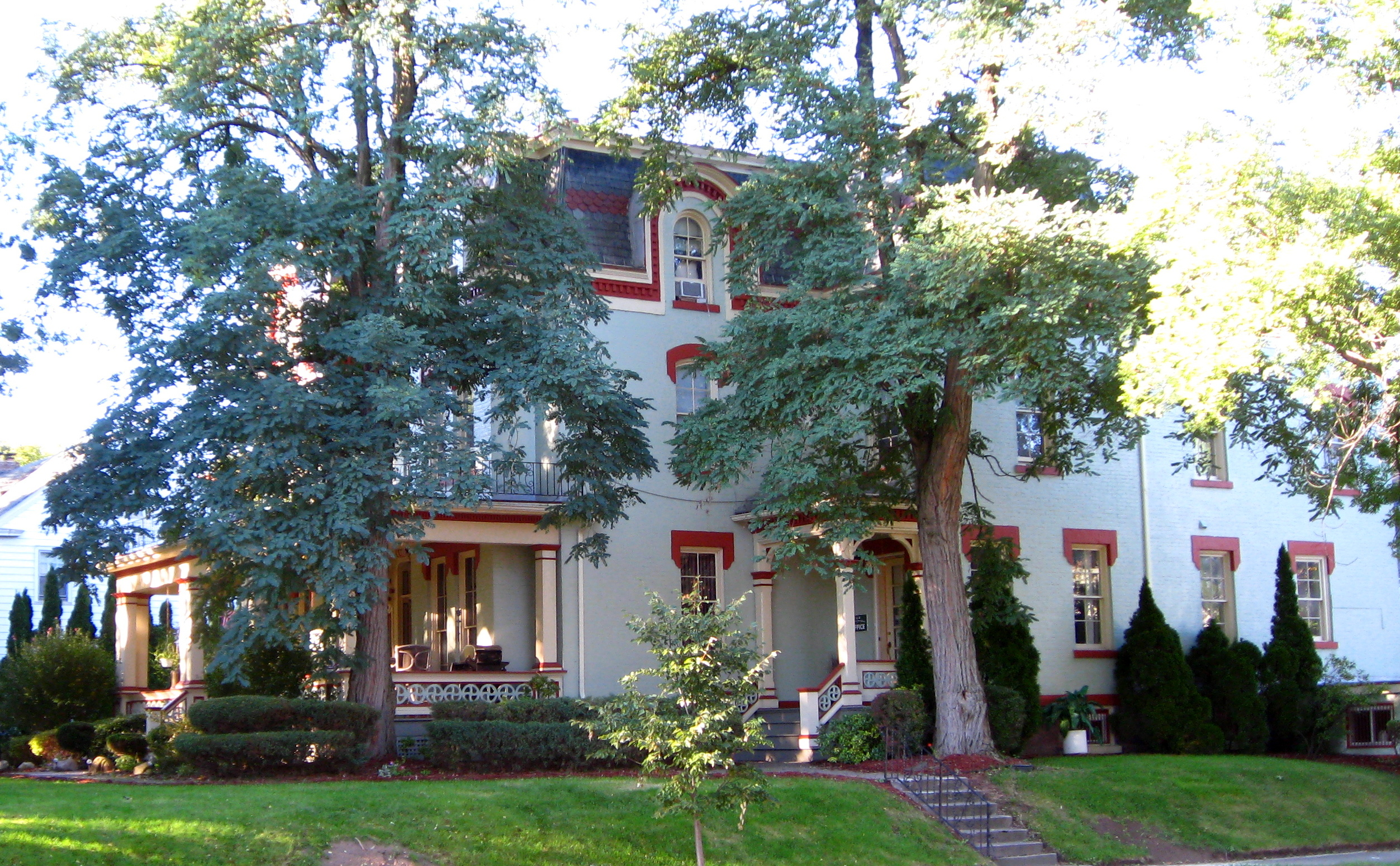

- Location within New York Location within the United States
- Interactive map showing the location of Vanderbeck House
- Location: 1295 Lake Ave., Rochester, New York
- Coordinates: 43°11′24″N 77°37′50″W
- Area: less than one acre
- Built: 1874
- Architectural style: Classical Revival, Second Empire
- NRHP reference No.: 84002739
- Added to NRHP: April 09, 1984

Vanderbeck House, also known as the Daughters of the American Revolution Chapter House, is a historic home located at Rochester in Monroe County, New York. It is a three-story brick structure with a slate-covered mansard roof and a foundation of sandstone blocks. It was built in 1874 in the Second Empire style. In 1959, the single family home was converted to offices and apartments.

It was listed on the National Register of Historic Places in 1984.
