= History of Rochester, New York =

History of American city

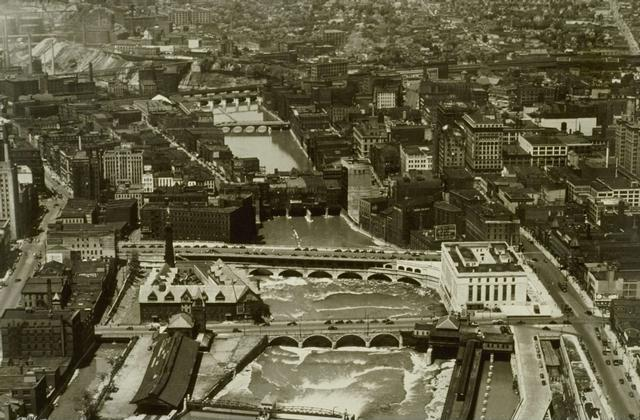
An aerial view of downtown Rochester from 1938

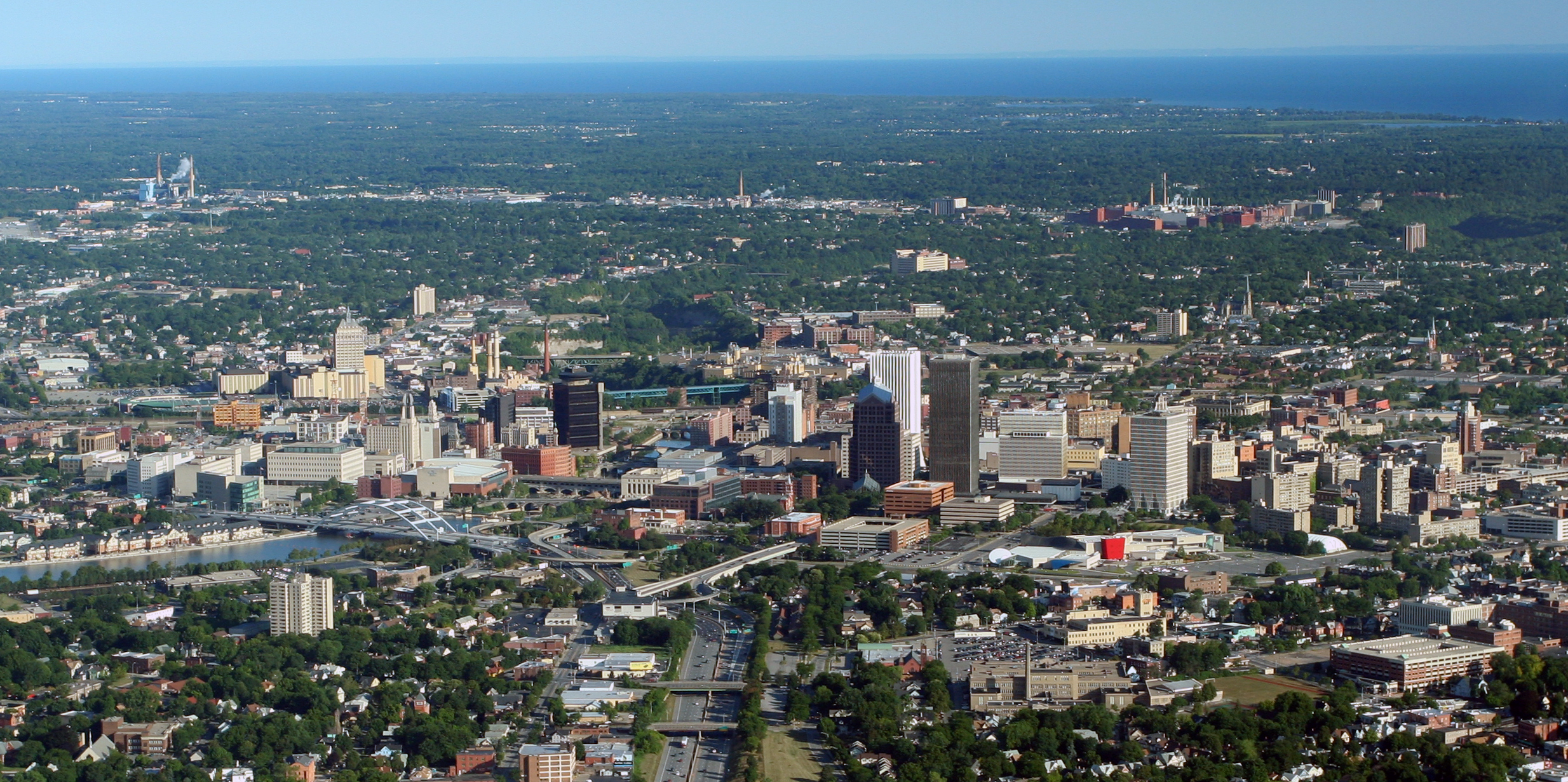
Urban Rochester as seen from the air

Settlement of the city of Rochester in western New York State began in the late 18th century, and the city grew rapidly following the opening of the Erie Canal. It became a major manufacturing center and attracted many immigrants from Italy, Germany, Ireland, and other countries, as well as a large population of Yankees of New England origin. Rochester served as a center of several reform movements, including abolitionism and women's rights. The city was long associated with the American photography industry and served as the headquarters of Eastman Kodak. Although many Great Lakes industrial cities experienced decline in the post-industrial era often described as the "Rust Belt," Rochester's economy was sustained for several decades after World War II by the presence of Ritter-Pfaudler, Bausch and Lomb, Eastman Kodak, Xerox, Gannett, and other major companies.

Of the 19 places in the United States named "Rochester", at least eight were named directly after the city, having been founded or settled by former residents. These include: Rochester, Indiana; Rochester, Texas; Rochester, Iowa; Rochester, Kentucky; Rochester, Michigan; Rochester, Minnesota; Rochester, Nevada; and Rochester, Ohio.

== Early settlement ==
Following the American Revolution, western New York was opened for development after New York and Massachusetts settled their competing claims for the area in December 1786 through the Treaty of Hartford. Under the compromise, New York retained political sovereignty over the land, while Massachusetts held pre-emptive rights to obtain title from the Native Americans and to own and profit from selling the land.

=== Phelps and Gorham purchase ===
On April 1, 1788, Massachusetts' pre-emptive right over all western New York lands—comprising some 6,000,000 acres (24,000 km^{2})—was sold to Oliver Phelps and Nathaniel Gorham, both of Massachusetts. The sales price was $1,000,000, payable in three equal annual installments of certain Massachusetts securities then trading at about 20 cents on the dollar. The right applied to all land west of a line running from the mouth of Sodus Bay on Lake Ontario, due south through Seneca Lake, to the 82nd milestone on the Pennsylvania border near Big Flats (the "Pre-emption Line"), extending to the Niagara River and Lake Erie (the "Phelps and Gorham Purchase"). To obtain title to the land, Phelps and Gorham were required to extinguish all Native American titles.

When the land did not sell as expected, Phelps and Gorham were unable to fund the extinguishment of Native American titles and defaulted on their second payment in 1790. They lost the right to purchase the pre-emptive rights to remaining lands of the Phelps and Gorham Purchase west of the Genesee River. This land, about 3,750,000 acres (15,000 km^{2}), reverted to Massachusetts, which re-sold the pre-emptive rights to Robert Morris in 1791 for $333,333.33 (about $24.1 million today). In 1792 and 1793, Morris sold most of the lands west of the Genesee to the Holland Land Company, though he did not extinguish Native American title to the land until the Treaty of Big Tree in September 1797. Morris reserved for himself a 500,000-acre (2,000 km^{2}) strip approximately 12 miles (19 km) wide, extending from Lake Ontario to the Pennsylvania border along the eastern edge of the Holland Purchase, known as the Morris Reserve. At the north end of the Reserve, Morris sold an 87,000-acre (350 km^{2}) triangular tract ("The Triangle Tract") to Herman Leroy, William Bayard, and John McEvers, and a 100,000-acre tract due west of the Triangle Tract to the state of Connecticut. Additional Phelps and Gorham lands east of the Genesee River which had not previously been sold were acquired by Robert Morris in 1791 and re-sold to The Pulteney Association, a syndicate of British investors.

=== Mill Yard Tract ===
Before defaulting on the rest of the land purchase agreement, Phelps and Gorham granted a 100-acre (0.4 km^{2}) lot within the Mill Yard Tract at the Upper Falls of the Genesee to Ebenezer "Indian" Allan, on condition that he build a grist mill and sawmill there by summer 1789 (the "100 Acre Tract"). Allan built the mills at the west end of the Upper Falls of the Genesee with the assistance of 14 men. The area at that time consisted of dense forest and swamp, and was affected by rattlesnakes and mosquitoes that spread malaria, then known as "Swamp Fever."

In March 1792, Allan sold the 100-acre (0.40 km^{2}) Tract to Benjamin Barton Sr. of New Jersey for $1,250. Barton resold the property to Samuel Ogden, an agent for Robert Morris, who in turn sold it in 1794 to Charles Williamson, agent for The Pulteney Association. On November 8, 1803, The Pulteney Association sold the 100-acre (0.40 km^{2}) Tract for $1,750, on a five-year land contract, to Col. Nathaniel Rochester (1752–1831), Maj. Charles Carroll, and Col. William Fitzhugh, all of Hagerstown, Maryland.

== Rochesterville and The Flour City ==
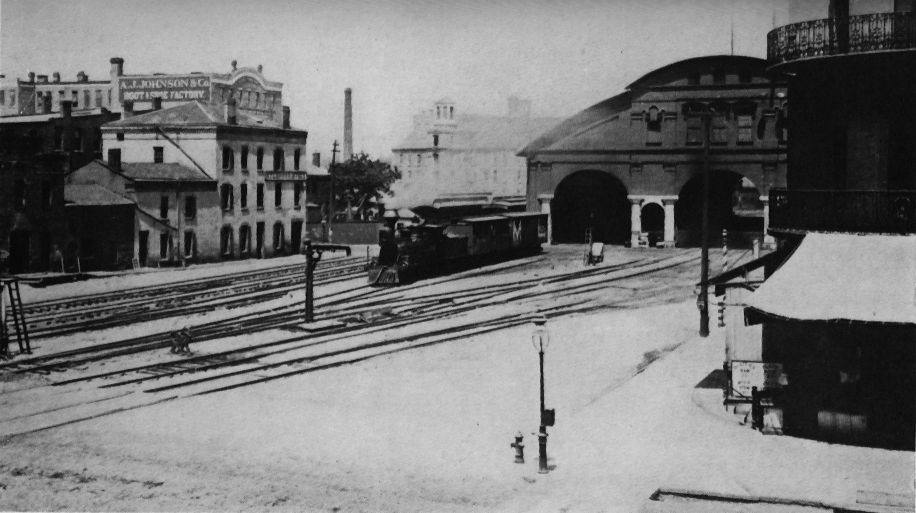
The New York Central Railroad train station built in 1853.

Rochester's early politics were shaped by ethnocultural divisions. Two rival groups competed for influence: Presbyterian Yankees from New England and Episcopalian New Yorkers from New York and Pennsylvania. When Irish Catholics began arriving in large numbers in the 1840s and supported the Democrats, the two Protestant factions formed a common front. Col. Rochester and his two partners left the mill-site undeveloped until 1811, when they completed payment and received the deed. The area's population at that time was 15. They then had the tract surveyed and laid out with streets and lots. The first lot was sold to Henry Skinner, at what is now the northwest corner of State and Main. In 1817, other landowners, principally the Brown Brothers (of Brown's Race and Brown's Square), joined their lands north to the 100-acre (0.40 km^{2}) Tract to form the Village of Rochesterville, with a population of 700.

In 1821, Monroe County was formed from parts of Ontario and Genesee counties, and Rochesterville was named the county seat. A two-story brick courthouse in the Greek Revival style was built at a cost of $7,600. In 1823, property belonging to Elisha Johnson on the east side of the Genesee across from the 100-acre (0.40 km^{2}) Tract was annexed, expanding Rochesterville to 1,012 acres (4.1 km^{2}) with a population of about 2,500. That year, "-ville" was dropped from the city's name. Also in 1823, the first 800-foot (244 m) Erie Canal Aqueduct was completed over the Genesee, just south of the Main Street Bridge; it was built over 16 months by 30 convicts from Auburn State Prison. In 1822, the Rochester Female Charitable Society was founded. Members paid twenty-five cents per year and contributed provisions, clothing, and bedding collected from the community. Visitors distributed goods and money to the poor of each district. By 1872, seventy-three districts had been established, each with a woman visitor. The organization was instrumental in founding the Rochester Orphan Asylum (now Hillside Children's Center), the Rochester City Hospital (now Rochester General Hospital), the first school, the workhouse, the Home for the Friendless (now The Friendly Home), the Industrial School, and The Visiting Nurse Service.

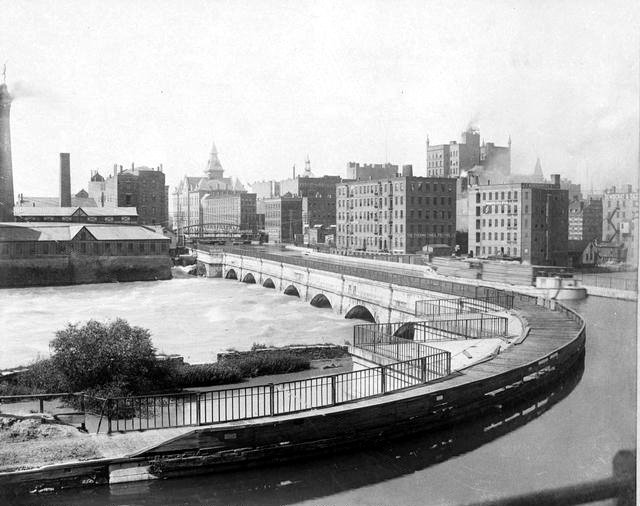
Aqueduct of the Erie Canal as it was built in 1842, replacing the original construction from 1823. In the 1920s, the Broad Street Bridge was erected on top of it.

After the Erie Canal opened east to the Hudson River in 1825, the city's economy and population grew rapidly. By 1830, the population reached 9,200, and Rochester was referred to as "The Young Lion of the West." The city became known as the Flour City, owing to the numerous flour mills located along waterfalls on the Genesee in the area now known as Brown's Race in downtown Rochester. In the first ten days after the canal opened east to the Hudson, 40,000 barrels (3,600 tons) of Rochester flour were shipped to Albany and New York City. Local millers processed 25,000 bushels of wheat daily. In 1829, the Rochester Athenaeum was founded as a reading society, charging members a five-dollar annual fee to attend lectures by speakers including Oliver Wendell Holmes Sr., Horace Greeley, and Ralph Waldo Emerson. The Athenaeum was one of the forerunners of the Rochester Institute of Technology.

In 1830 and 1831, Rochester experienced one of the largest Protestant revivals of the Second Great Awakening, led by Charles Grandison Finney. A contemporary pastor who was converted during the Rochester meetings described the impact of the revival:

The whole community was stirred. Religion was the topic of conversation in the house, in the shop, in the office, and on the street. The only theater in the city was converted into a livery stable; the only circus into a soap and candle factory. Grog shops were closed; the Sabbath was honored; the sanctuaries were thronged with happy worshippers; a new impulse was given to every philanthropic enterprise; the fountains of benevolence were opened, and men lived to good.

By 1834, some 20 flour mills were producing 500,000 barrels (44,000 t) annually, the population reached 13,500, and the city area expanded to 4,000 acres (16 km^{2}). Rochester was re-chartered as a city, and Jonathan Child, son-in-law of Col. Rochester, was elected its first mayor.

In 1837, the Rochester Orphan Asylum was founded by the Rochester Female Charitable Society. The Asylum was located on South Sophia Street (now South Plymouth Avenue) and later moved to Hubbell Park. Following a fire on January 8, 1901, that killed 31 residents, the Asylum was relocated to Pinnacle Hill and reconstructed as a series of cottages called the Hillside Home (now Hillside Children's Center, part of Hillside Family of Agencies). The Charitable Society also founded Rochester City Hospital on Buffalo Street (now West Main Street), on the site of the old Buffalo Street Cemetery. Construction on the hospital began in 1845, but it was not occupied until 1863. By 1838, Rochester was the largest flour-producing city in the world.

== The Flower City ==
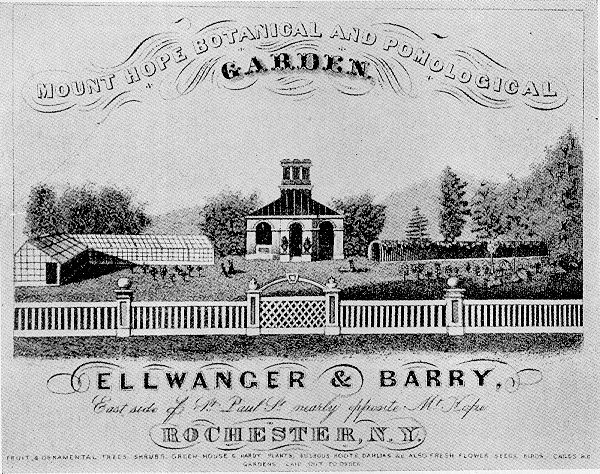
Ellwanger and Barry Nursery

In 1830, William A. Reynolds started a seed business at the corner of Sophia and Buffalo Streets (now South Plymouth Avenue and West Main Street). This was the origin of the Ellwanger & Barry Nursery Co., which was eventually relocated to Mt. Hope Avenue, across from Mount Hope Cemetery. James Vick and Joseph Harris also established nursery businesses. Vick used mass marketing and regular customer correspondence to build one of the most prominent seed companies in the United States. His flower garden on East Avenue attracted visitors; the location is now bounded by Vick Park A and Vick Park B. The population in 1830 was 9,207, ranking Rochester as the 25th largest city in the United States. By 1840, the population had grown to 20,191, making it the 19th largest. In 1842, the original aqueduct over the Genesee River was replaced with a larger one slightly south of the first; this latter aqueduct now supports Broad Street.

By 1850, the population reached 36,000, making Rochester the 21st largest city in the United States. Westward expansion had shifted the center of farming to the Great Plains, and Rochester's importance as a flour-milling center declined. Several seed companies in Rochester had grown to become among the largest in the world, with Ellwanger & Barry Nursery Co. being the largest. Rochester's nickname changed from the Flour City to the Flower City. In 1850, the University of Rochester was founded in the U.S. Hotel on Buffalo St, affiliated with the Baptist Church, and offered two four-year courses. In 1851, a new three-story county courthouse in the Greek Revival style was constructed, built from brick manufactured at Cobb's Hill by Gideon Cobb, at a cost of $76,000.

== Abolition movement ==
Rochester was the home for many years of abolitionist Frederick Douglass, a formerly enslaved African American who in 1847 began publishing an abolitionist newspaper, The North Star, in Rochester. Other prominent abolitionists in Rochester included Amy and Isaac Post and Abigail Bush.

Douglass stated "I know of no place in the Union where I could have located at the time with less resistance, or received a larger measure of sympathy and cooperation." However, upon his arrival, he encountered racial barriers at educational and entertainment venues in the city, and his daughter was excluded from classes with white students. Rochester's public schools were desegregated in 1856, following a boycott campaign by local African-American families.

Douglass delivered his speech "The Meaning of July Fourth to the Negro" at a meeting organized by the Rochester Ladies Antislavery Association at Corinthian Hall, Rochester, on July 5, 1852. In 1857, Susan B. Anthony and William Lloyd Garrison spoke at an abolition meeting. In October 1858, William H. Seward, a leading opponent of slavery, delivered a speech to a Republican audience at Corinthian Hall, arguing that the political and economic systems of North and South were incompatible and that the "irrepressible conflict" between them would result in the nation becoming "either entirely a slave-holding nation, or entirely a free-labor nation."

=== The Underground Railroad ===
In the years leading up to the Civil War, numerous locations in the Rochester area served as safe houses to shelter fugitive slaves before they were transported, often via the Genesee River, to Canada. The route was part of the Underground Railroad. Other stations were located in areas surrounding Rochester, including Brighton, Pittsford, Mendon, and Webster. A station in North Chili, west of Rochester, was run by abolitionist Methodists and was an important site in the formation of the Free Methodist Church in 1860. The denomination's first college, Roberts Wesleyan College, was built on the site.

A contemporary described the Frederick Douglass homes as "a labyrinth of secret panels and closets, where he secreted the poor human wretches from the man hunters and the blood-hounds, who were usually not far behind."

== Women's rights movement ==
Rochester was involved with women's rights from an early date. The Rochester Women's Rights Convention, held on August 2, 1848, was the second women's rights convention in the nation, following the Seneca Falls Convention two weeks earlier in nearby Seneca Falls. The Rochester convention elected a woman as its presiding officer, a step that was controversial at the time and was opposed by some of the meeting's leading participants. It was the first public meeting composed of both men and women in the United States to take that step.

Susan B. Anthony, a national leader of the women's suffrage movement, was based in Rochester. In 1872, she was arrested for voting illegally in Rochester along with fourteen other local women, generating national attention. Her trial, United States v. Susan B. Anthony, was held in a federal circuit court presided over by a Supreme Court justice. The judge directed the jury to deliver a guilty verdict and ordered Anthony to pay a fine of $100; Anthony refused, stating "I shall never pay a dollar of your unjust penalty," and never did. Initially ridiculed for her views on women's rights, Anthony gained increasing public recognition over the course of her career. She celebrated her eightieth birthday at the White House at the invitation of President William McKinley. The Nineteenth Amendment to the United States Constitution, which guaranteed women the right to vote in 1920, was popularly known as the Susan B. Anthony Amendment in recognition of her decades of advocacy, which she did not live to see ratified. Anthony's home is now a National Historic Landmark known as the National Susan B. Anthony Museum and House.

Despite the activism of Anthony and others, women's suffrage remained contentious in Rochester, and the city voted against a state constitutional amendment granting women the franchise in 1917.

== Post-war industrial boom ==
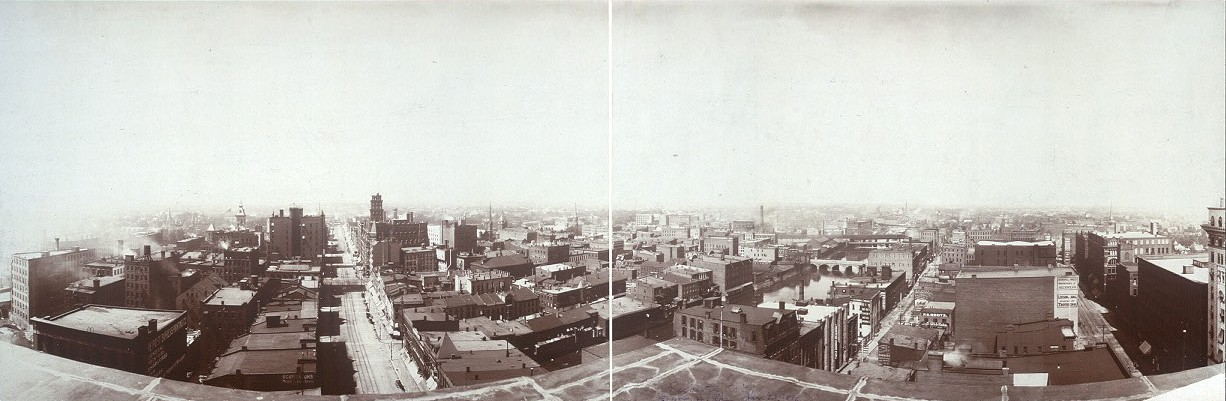
Rochester, photographed circa 1896 by William H. Rau

Between 1860 and 1900, Rochester's population grew from 48,000 to 162,800, though its national ranking fell from 18th to 24th largest. During this period, the city expanded in area on both sides of the Genesee River, annexing parts of the towns of Brighton, Gates, Greece, and Irondequoit. Companies founded during this era included Bausch & Lomb by John Jacob Bausch and Henry Lomb, Eastman Kodak by George Eastman, Western Union Telegraph by Hiram Sibley and Don Alonzo Watson, Gleason Works by William Gleason, and R.T. French Company by Robert French. Other industries that developed included clothing manufacturing, shoe manufacturing, brewing, and machine tools. In 1875, Rochester's first city hall opened at Fitzhugh and the Erie Canal (now Broad Street), built at a cost of over $335,000 on the site of the First Presbyterian Church, which had burned in 1869. The church sold the lot to the city for $25,000. This city hall housed city government until 1978.

In 1882, tolls on the Erie Canal ended; over 57 years, New York State had realized a profit of $51,000,000 from the canal. In September 1885, a group of Rochester businessmen founded the Mechanics Institute to provide free evening instruction in drawing and other subjects relevant to industrial pursuits. Henry Lomb of Bausch & Lomb served as the Institute's first president.

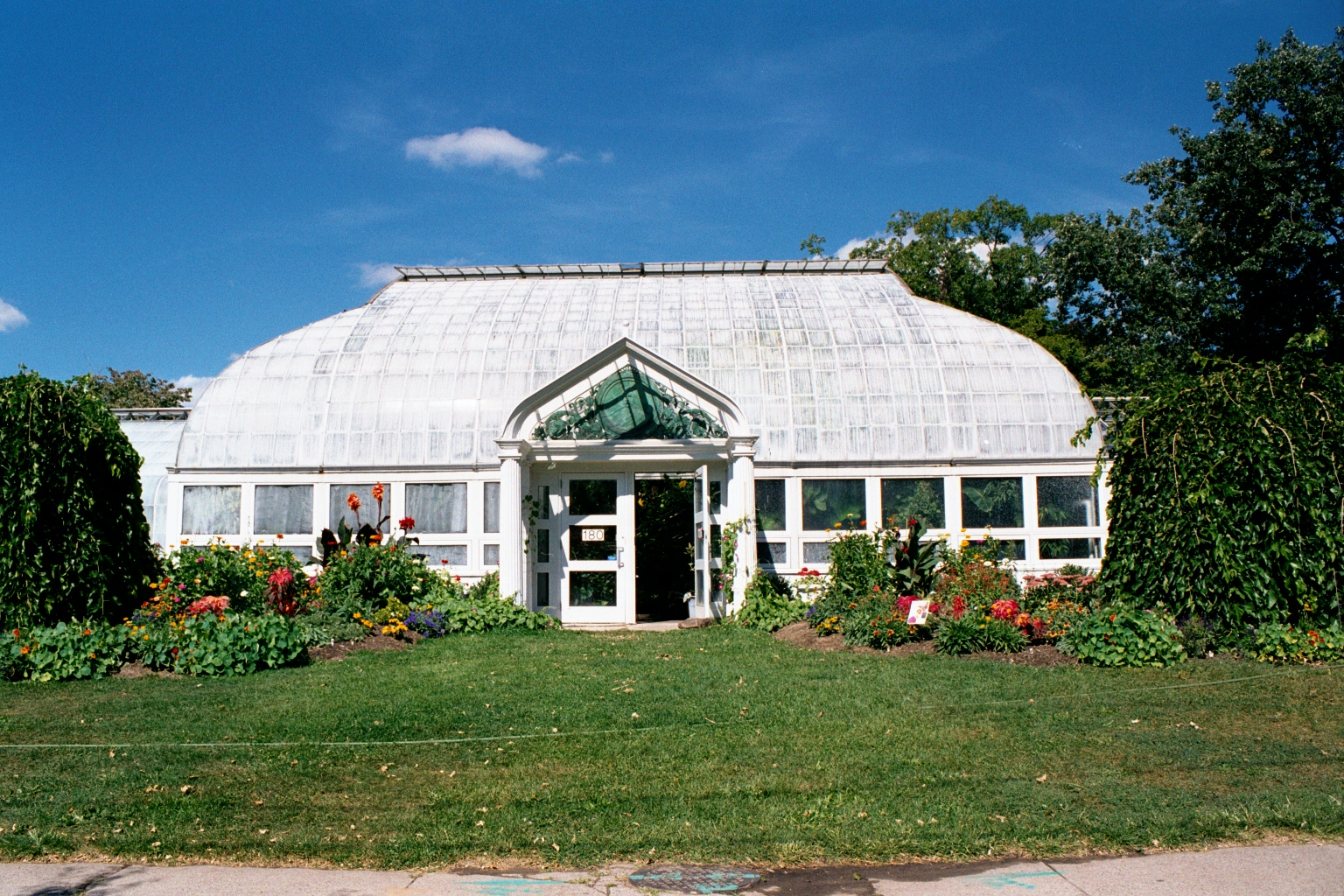
Lamberton Conservatory from 1911 in the Highland Park

During this period, many of Rochester's public parks were established. Ellwanger & Barry and others donated land in 1871 for Maplewood Park and in 1889 for Highland Park. In 1895, George Eastman and James P. B. Duffy donated an additional 120 acres (0.5 km^{2}) for Highland Park. On Independence Day 1894, community leaders laid the cornerstone for the third County Courthouse (now the County Office Building). Two years and $881,000 later, the four-story granite and marble courthouse in the Italian Renaissance style was completed. In 1897, the first master's degrees were awarded by the University of Rochester, and in 1900, largely through the efforts of Susan B. Anthony, women were admitted.

In 1891, the Mechanics Institute merged with the Rochester Athenaeum to form the Rochester Athenaeum and Mechanics Institute (RAMI). The Institute focused on comprehensive instruction in mechanical subjects, graduating increasing numbers of professionals who entered industry in Rochester and elsewhere. In 1892 the Cook Opera House opened at 25 South Ave between Main St and Broad St.

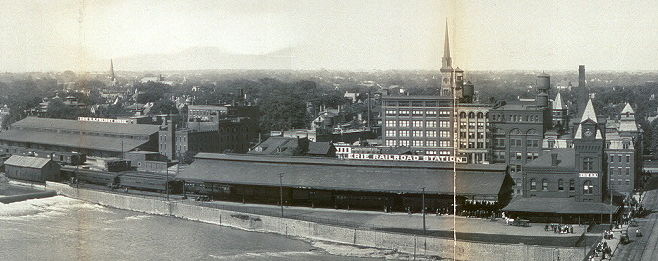
The Erie Railroad's station in 1906

By the mid-1890s, five freight and passenger railroads served the city, each with a separate station. Transportation services expanded further with the arrival of inter-urban electric railroads such as the Rochester, Lockport and Buffalo Railroad and the Rochester, Syracuse and Eastern Rapid Railroad in the early 20th century. The Lehigh Valley Railroad's station and the former Buffalo, Rochester and Pittsburgh Railway terminal are the only surviving stations built by these railroads.

Rochester was also the home of the Cunningham automobile, produced by carriage maker James Cunningham, Son and Company. Production was small, approximately 400 units per year, including hearses, all designed by Volney Lacey.

== The 20th century ==
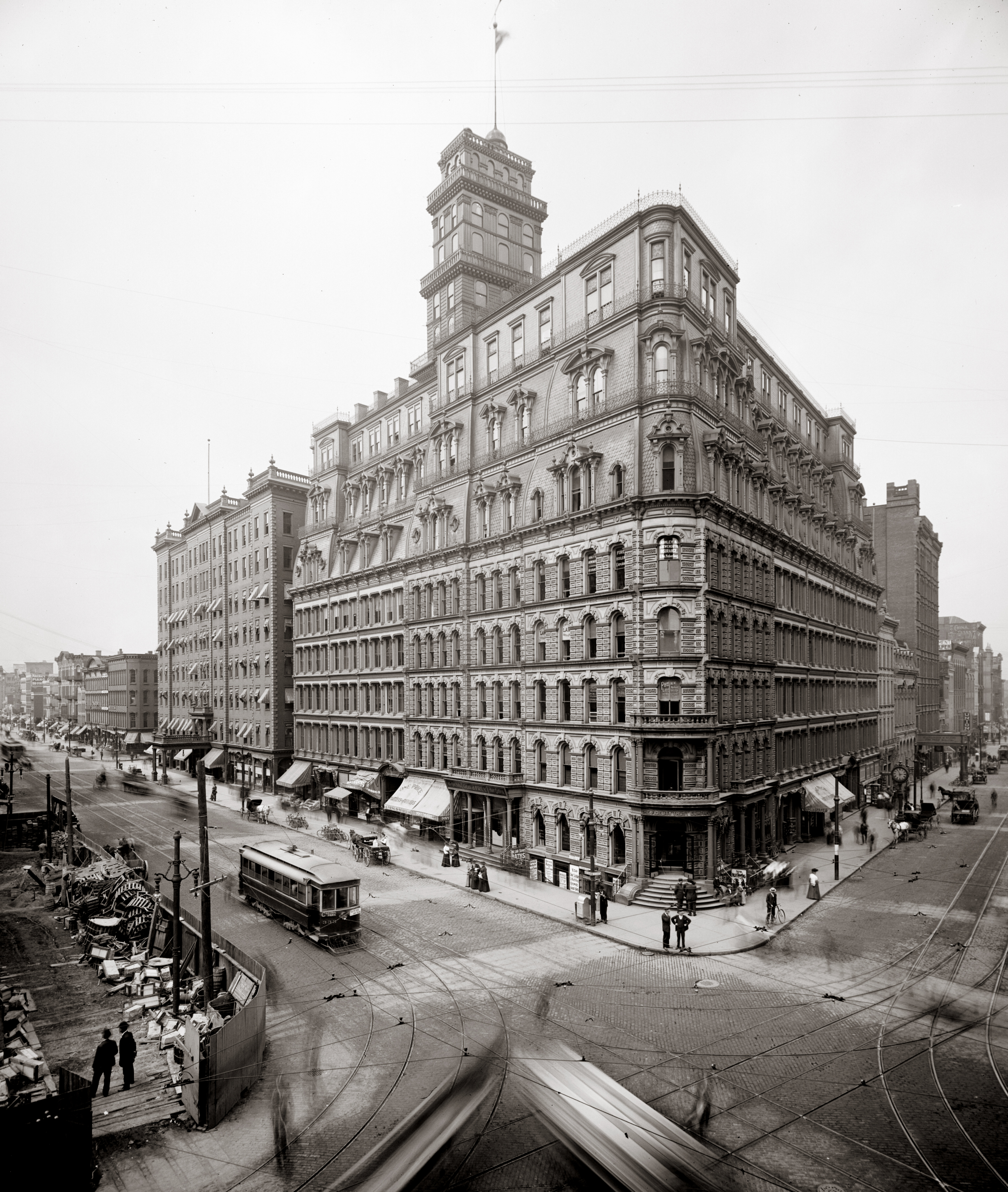
The Powers Building, listed on the National Register of Historic Places circa 1904

At the turn of the 20th century, Rochester was a prosperous manufacturing city. Although the nursery business was declining, some former nursery land had been developed into residential districts along East Avenue, Park Avenue, and near Highland Park off Mount Hope Avenue. In 1901, a fire at the Rochester Orphan Asylum killed 31 people, and the institution was relocated from Hubbell Park to Pinnacle Hill.

Rochester's skilled labor force made the city a significant industrial contributor to the World War II effort, while surrounding farms provided food for both military and civilian populations. In 1944, the Rochester Athenaeum and Mechanics Institute changed its name to The Rochester Institute of Technology to reflect the specialized professional nature of its programs.

In 1904, R. T. French introduced prepared mustard at the St. Louis World's Fair, where it was paired with the hot dog.

In the early 1900s, both George Eastman and Andrew Carnegie made substantial donations to the University of Rochester. Eastman also funded the establishment of the Eastman Dental Dispensary. In 1908, Francis Baker donated 120 acres (0.5 km^{2}) for Genesee Valley Park, and Durand-Eastman Park opened, a gift of Henry Durand and George Eastman.

In 1913, the Memorial Art Gallery on the University of Rochester's Prince Street Campus was founded as a gift from Emily Sibley Watson in memory of her son, architect James Averell. In 1918, the Erie Canal through Rochester was closed and abandoned after the Barge Canal opened, transiting Rochester through Genesee Valley Park. The Court Street Dam was also built in 1918 to raise the river level to that of the Barge Canal, eliminating the need for an aqueduct or locks but submerging the Upper Falls and the Castelton Rapids.

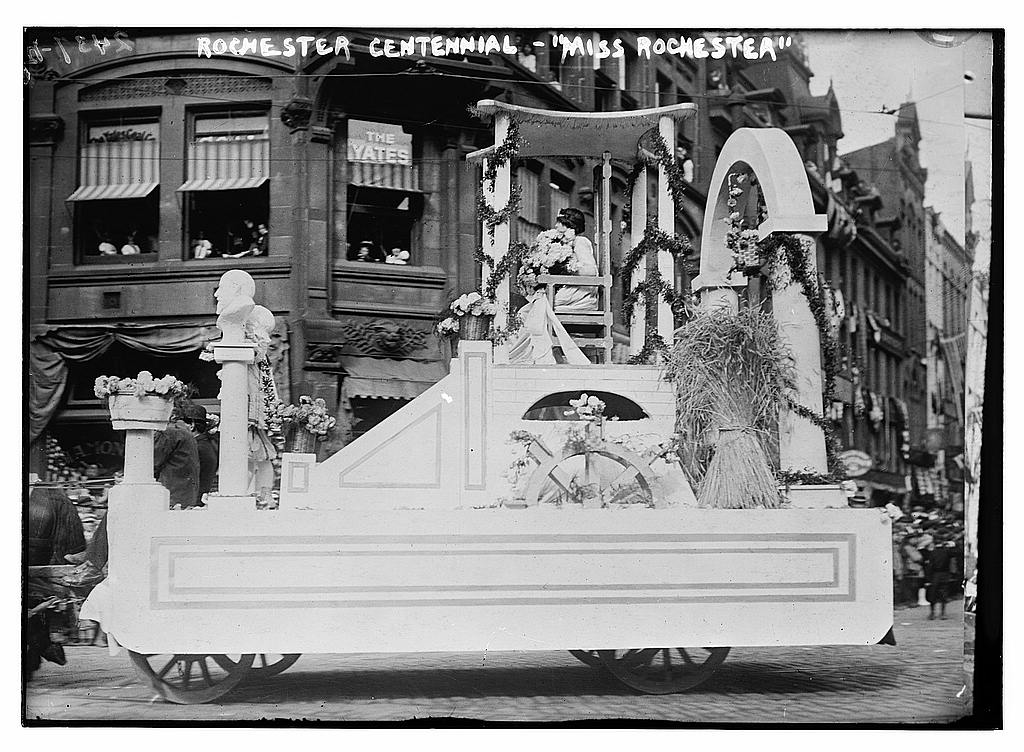
Miss Rochester in the Centennial Parade

By 1920, Rochester's population had reached 290,720, ranking it the 23rd largest city in the United States. That year, the city purchased the abandoned Erie Canal lands within city limits for use as a heavy rail mass transit and freight system. In 1921, the first Lilac Week was held, celebrating Rochester's horticultural legacy in Highland Park. In 1922, Rochester's first radio station began broadcasting, and the Eastman Theatre opened as an adjunct to the Eastman School of Music of the University of Rochester. In 1925, George Eastman arranged a land swap with Oak Hill Country Club: the Oak Hill property west of Mt. Hope Cemetery on the east side of the Genesee River was given to the University of Rochester for its River Campus, and the country club moved to Pittsford. In 1925, the university opened its Medical School and Strong Memorial Hospital on Crittenden Road, and by 1927, construction began on the River Campus. The university awarded its first Ph.D. in 1925, and by 1930, several departments were training doctoral candidates. In 1928, Red Wing Stadium opened. That year, the Rochester Democrat and Chronicle, the morning newspaper, was purchased by Frank Gannett.

By the 1920s and 1930s, Rochester's population was roughly half Protestant and half Catholic, with a significant Jewish population as well. In 1938, the city had 214 religious congregations, two-thirds of which had been founded after 1880. The city had been adding an average of 2.6 new congregations per year, many founded by immigrants from Southern and Eastern Europe. During peak immigration from 1900 to 1920, dozens of churches were established, including four Roman Catholic churches with Italian clergy, three Roman Catholic churches with Slavic clergy, a Greek Orthodox Church, a Polish Baptist church, 15 Jewish synagogues, and four small Italian Protestant mission churches (Baptist, Evangelical, Methodist, and Presbyterian).

By 1930, the population had reached 328,132, making Rochester the 22nd largest city in the United States. The University of Rochester opened its River Campus for men, with the Prince Street Campus serving as the Women's Campus. The Rochester Municipal Airport opened on Scottsville Road. In the 1930s, Eastman Kodak introduced Kodachrome film. The subway was constructed in the old canal bed, and street railways were diverted to the subway or replaced by buses. From 1927 until 1956, Rochester was the smallest city in America with a subway system. Rochester celebrated its centennial as a city in 1934. In 1936, the Rundel Memorial Building opened as the headquarters of the Rochester Public Library, situated above the bed of the old Erie Canal between Broad Street and Court Street.

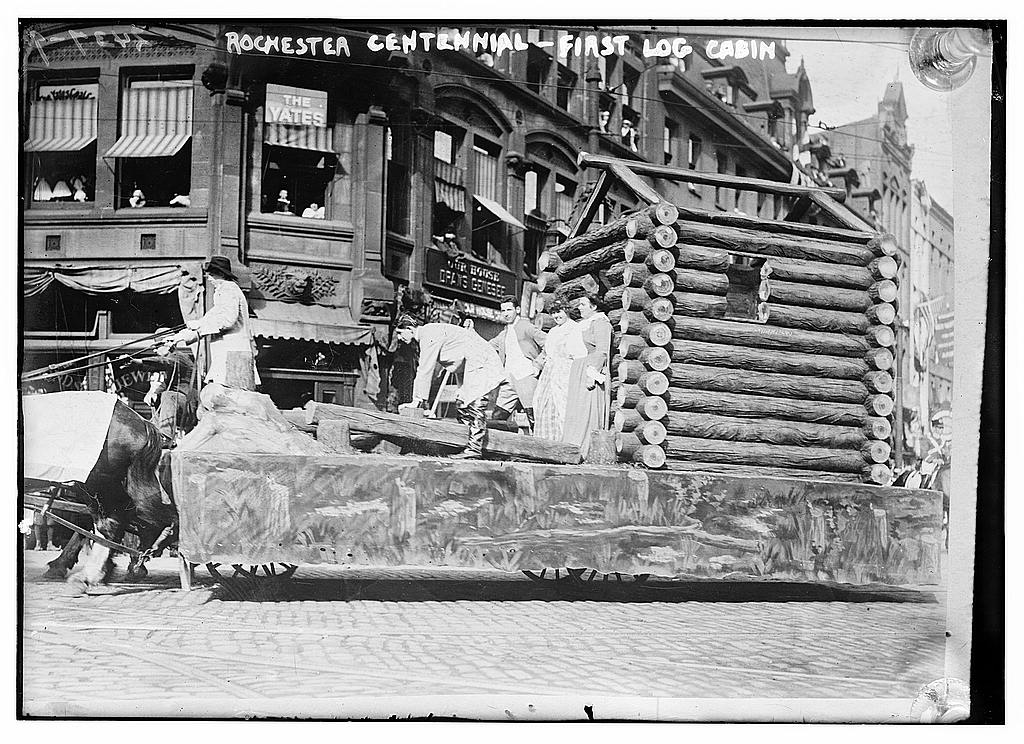
The "First Log Cabin" in the Centennial Parade

By 1940, the population had decreased to 324,975, the first decline since the city's founding, though Rochester remained the 23rd largest city in the United States. With the onset of World War II, approximately 29,000 Rochester-area men were drafted into military service.

During the war, Cobbs Hill Park was used as a prisoner of war camp. The first prisoners arrived on September 28, 1943. Sixty Italian prisoners worked on area farms and food processing plants 10 hours a day, six days a week, at $0.80 per day. After Italy joined the Allied forces on October 12, 1943, the Italian prisoners became unguarded internees and were replaced by German prisoners on June 26, 1944. In February 1945, seven successive snowstorms paralyzed the city, prompting authorities to bring prisoners from the Hamlin Camp for snow removal. Cobbs Hill Park housed 100 Germans, and 175 more were held at Edgerton Park. Snow removal by prisoners was conducted at unannounced locations under city police guard.

Following the war, the "Rochester Plan" called for the development of affordable housing for returning veterans and their families. Three garden apartment complexes were built as part of the plan: Fernwood Park, Norton Village, and Ramona Park.

=== 1945-1999 ===
By 1950, the city's population had grown slightly to 332,488, but Rochester had fallen to 32nd among U.S. cities. During the 1950s, Xerox Corporation (originally Haloid Corporation) expanded as it commercialized Chester Carlson's xerography patents, becoming the world leader in xerographic imaging. Eastman Kodak continued to dominate the film and camera industry and remained Rochester's largest industrial employer. Other major employers included Gleason Works, Stromberg-Carlson, Taylor Instrument, Ritter Dental Equipment, Rochester Products Division of General Motors, and Pfaudler-Permutit.

In 1955, the Colleges for Men and Women of the University of Rochester were merged. In 1958, three new schools were created in engineering, business administration, and education. G. Curtis Gerling's Smugtown USA (Plaza Publishers, 1957; reprinted 1993) offered a critical examination of the city's culture in the 1940s and 1950s.

By the 1960s, population was shifting from city to suburbs, with substantial growth in adjacent towns including Greece, Gates, Chili, Henrietta, Brighton, and Irondequoit.

The 1960 census recorded a population of 318,611 and a drop in national rank to 38th. The Rochester 1964 race riot in July of that year was one of the earliest urban riots of the civil rights era. The disturbance broke out in Rochester's predominantly African American districts on July 24, 1964, and lasted three days before the National Guard restored order. Although initially attributed to outside agitators, all rioters arrested were from the Rochester area. The riot prompted a reappraisal of employment and housing practices affecting the city's African American population, which had tripled in the preceding decade. Subsequent changes included the appointment of the city's first African-American public safety director and the hiring of African-American police officers and radio announcers.

Also in the 1960s, the city began a process of urban renewal with the construction of Midtown Plaza, described as the first indoor shopping mall in a traditional downtown area in the United States. When the New York State Department of Public Works decided to route the Inner Loop expressway through the downtown Rochester Institute of Technology campus, the decision was made to relocate the institution to the suburbs. The move to a larger campus facilitated RIT's 1966 selection as the site for the National Technical Institute for the Deaf, and the 1,300-acre (5.3 km^{2}) campus in suburban Henrietta opened in 1968. Urban renewal decisions in Rochester had mixed results; several theaters and the New York Central Bragdon Station were demolished in 1966 to make way for new construction.

During the 1960s and 1970s, Rochester developed a notable jazz scene. Musicians performed on Clarissa Street, moving between clubs. The Pythodd Room, which reached its peak in the late 1960s and 1970s under the ownership of Delores Thomas and her son Stanley Thomas Jr., hosted performers including Stevie Wonder, Jimmy Smith, and brothers Chuck and Gap Mangione. The Mangiones grew up in Rochester, and Chuck Mangione became a prominent jazz trumpeter with crossover appeal.

In 1970, the Rochester crime family bombed nine buildings, including three Jewish synagogues and two Black churches, in the Rochester bombings, intended to divert the attention of local authorities from organized crime. One person was injured.

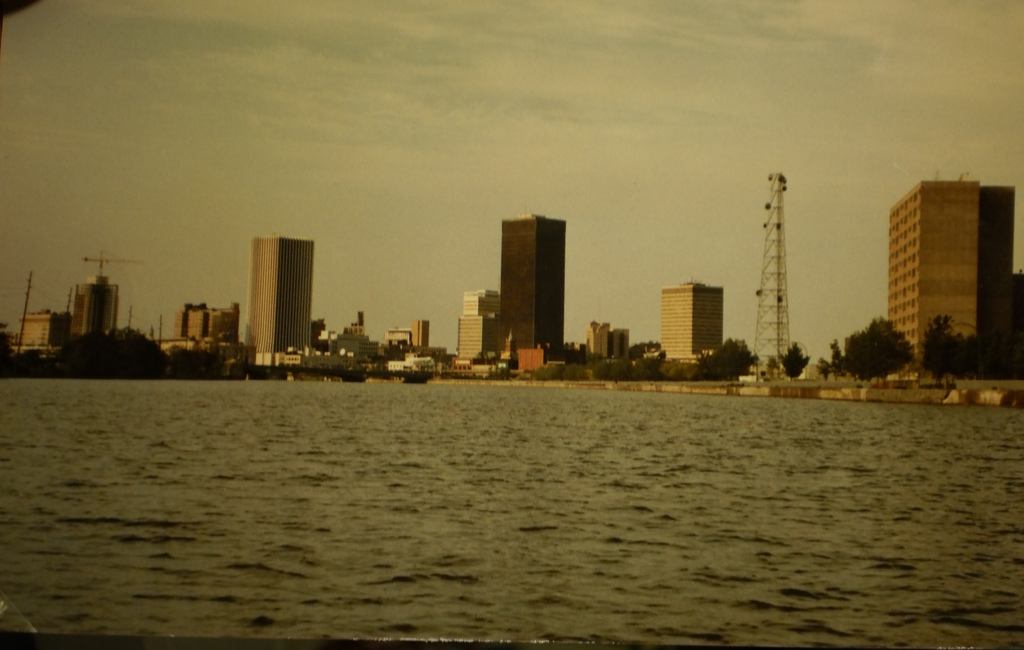
Skyline of Rochester in 1987, Xerox Tower in the center, Lincoln Rochester Trust Company (Chase Bank) building to its left. Under construction Hyatt Regency Rochester far left.

In 1969, Xerox Corporation opened the thirty-story Xerox Tower at Broad Street East and Clinton Avenue South, although Xerox also relocated its corporate headquarters to Stamford, Connecticut around the same time. Lincoln Rochester Trust Company (now Chase Bank) opened the 28-story Chase Tower at Clinton Avenue South and East Main Street. During the 1970s, new offices and hotels were constructed along State Street, north of Main Street, resulting in the demolition of most of Front Street and part of Corinthian Street. New hotels were opened at Main Street and the Genesee River and at South Avenue and Main Street, in conjunction with a substantial reconstruction of the Main Street Bridge. In 1978, city hall moved to the old Federal Building at State and Church. In the mid-1980s, construction began on a high-rise hotel downtown adjacent to the new Rochester Riverside Convention Center. The project stalled in 1987, and the Hyatt Regency Rochester did not open until 1992, after being completed through a public-private partnership involving several local business leaders.

In the 1990s, Frontier Field, a new baseball stadium, was built for the Rochester Red Wings near the Kodak office building. Bausch and Lomb constructed a new world headquarters south of Main Street straddling Stone Street. A new Central Library was erected across from the Rundel Library Building on South Avenue, expanding the capacity of the Rochester Public Library complex.

== The new millennium ==
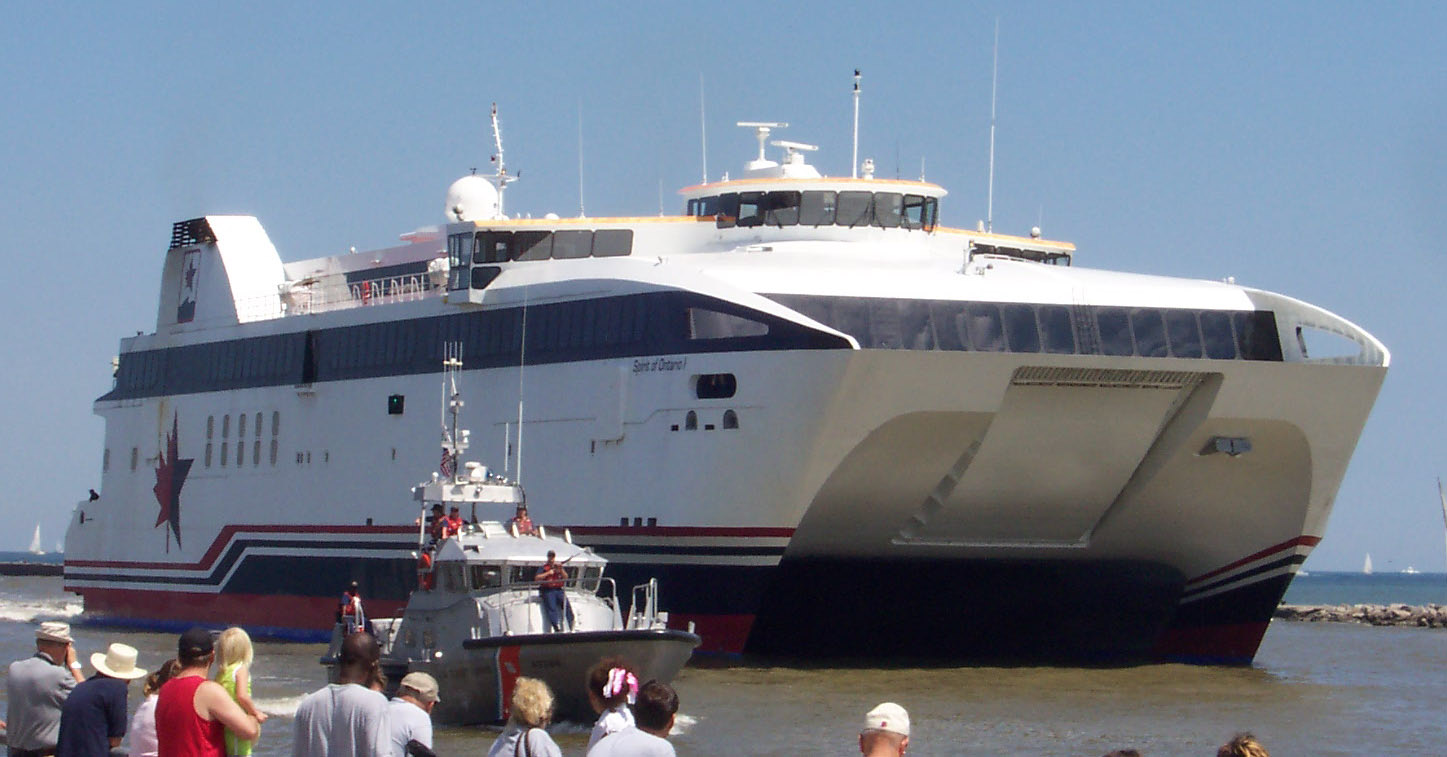
The Spirit of Ontario I, center of one of the most controversial local issues of the 2000s

The population of the City of Rochester at the 2000 census was 219,773, a decline of 33.9% from its 1950 peak. In 2003, Rochester built a ferry terminal for the Spirit of Ontario I. The ferry service, initiated under the William A. Johnson Jr. administration, experienced operational difficulties. Newly elected Mayor Robert Duffy announced that the city would discontinue funding for the ferry. The Spirit of Ontario I was sold in 2007 to the German company Förde Reederei Seetouristik Gmbh & Co (FRS) for $29.8 million.

In 2006, a new stadium funded by private and public sources, PAETEC Park, opened near Frontier Field as the home of the Rhinos professional soccer team. The facility subsequently changed naming sponsors and was later known as Capelli Sport Stadium and then Marina Auto Stadium.

In 2007, PAETEC Holding Corp. announced plans to build a new tower downtown in place of Midtown Plaza. The PAETEC Tower was originally planned to exceed the height of the Xerox Tower. Following the company's sale, the plans were scaled down, and a smaller headquarters building for PaeTec's successor firm, Windstream, was completed in 2013.

Mayor Duffy pursued "mayoral control" of the city school district, similar to governance reorganizations in New York City and Chicago. The effort stalled at the end of 2010, when Duffy was elected New York State Lieutenant Governor as part of Governor Andrew Cuomo's administration. His successor, Thomas Richards, elected in a 2011 special election, indicated the issue had been set aside.

In 2013, Lovely Warren was elected Rochester's first female mayor. Under Warren, a project to fill in the Inner Loop and convert it to a boulevard was undertaken, and plans for a performing arts center on a parcel of the former Midtown Plaza were developed.

City council member Malik Evans defeated Warren in a Democratic Party primary in June 2021 and won the general election in November, becoming the city's 71st mayor in January 2022.

== Civil unrest ==
- The Gorham Street Riot (June 1852) – labor dispute
- Canal Strike of 1855 – suppressed by the Union Gray militia
- Riot at Corinthian Hall (1861) – anti-abolitionist unrest
- The Howard Riot (1872)
  - Suppressed by the army
- The Street Car Strike of 1889
- Rochester 1964 race riot – suppressed by the National Guard
- 1967 unrest
- 2020 unrest following the killing of Daniel Prude
