= History of Rochester =

History of Rochester may refer to:

- History of Rochester, Kent, England
- History of Rochester, New York, USA
