= Clarissa Street =

Street in Rochester, New York, United States

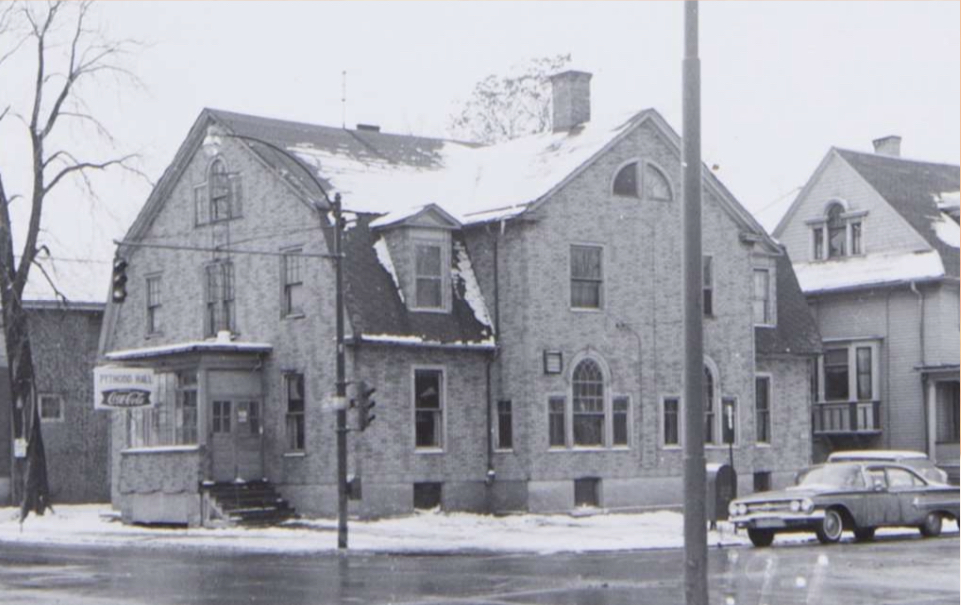
Pythodd Room on Clarissa Street

Clarissa Street was a street in the Third Ward of Rochester, New York that, during the late 19th and early-to-mid 20th centuries, had many African-American-owned businesses, clubs, venues, churches and bars. Among these was the Pythodd Room, a jazz club that hosted local performers and nationally known musicians. Because segregation barred them from most white-owned venues, black residents and visitors attended and performed at those on Clarissa Street instead, giving the street a vivid nightlife. The Interstate 490's construction in the 1970s displaced many of the street's residents and caused its culture to decline; now it is "an ordinary neighborhood and common commute".

Blues musician Son House lived at nearby Greig Street and Clarissa Street.
