= The Pythodd Room =

Rochester, NY jazz club that closed in 1974

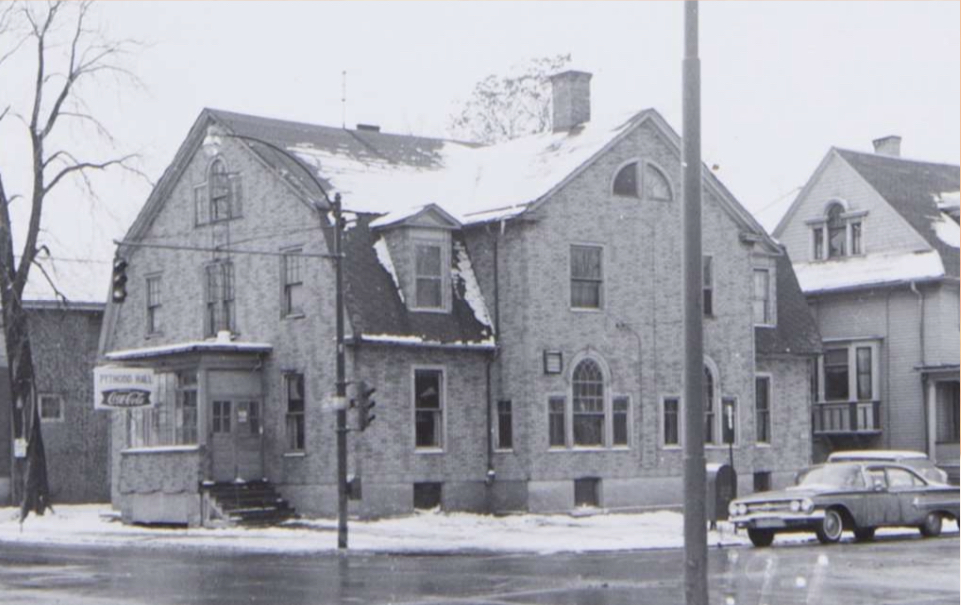
- Pythodd Room c.1950s
- Interactive map of The Pythodd Room
- Address: 159 Troup Street; Rochester, New York; United States of America
- Coordinates: 43°9′4″N 77°37′8″W
- Capacity: 240 persons
- Type: jazz club
- Record attendance: Over 400 persons

Construction
- Opened: Private opening: c.1930s, Public opening: 1953
- Years active: As a private meeting hall: c.1930s—1942. As a membership-based social club: 1942—1953. As a privately owned music venue open to the public: 1953—1966 (closed 1966—1968), 1969—1972

The Pythodd Room ("The Pythodd") was a prominent jazz club on the national Chitlin' Circuit located on Clarissa Street, in Rochester, New York's historic Third Ward neighborhood which had many African American businesses. At 159 Troup Street, it was originally intended as a meeting space for two local Black-run benevolent societies, the Colored Knights of Pythias and the Odd Fellows. By the 1950s, notable jazz musicians such as Pee Wee Ellis, Ron Carter, Roy McCurdy, and brothers Chuck Mangione and Gap Mangione began their careers as young regular performers at the Pythodd.

== History ==
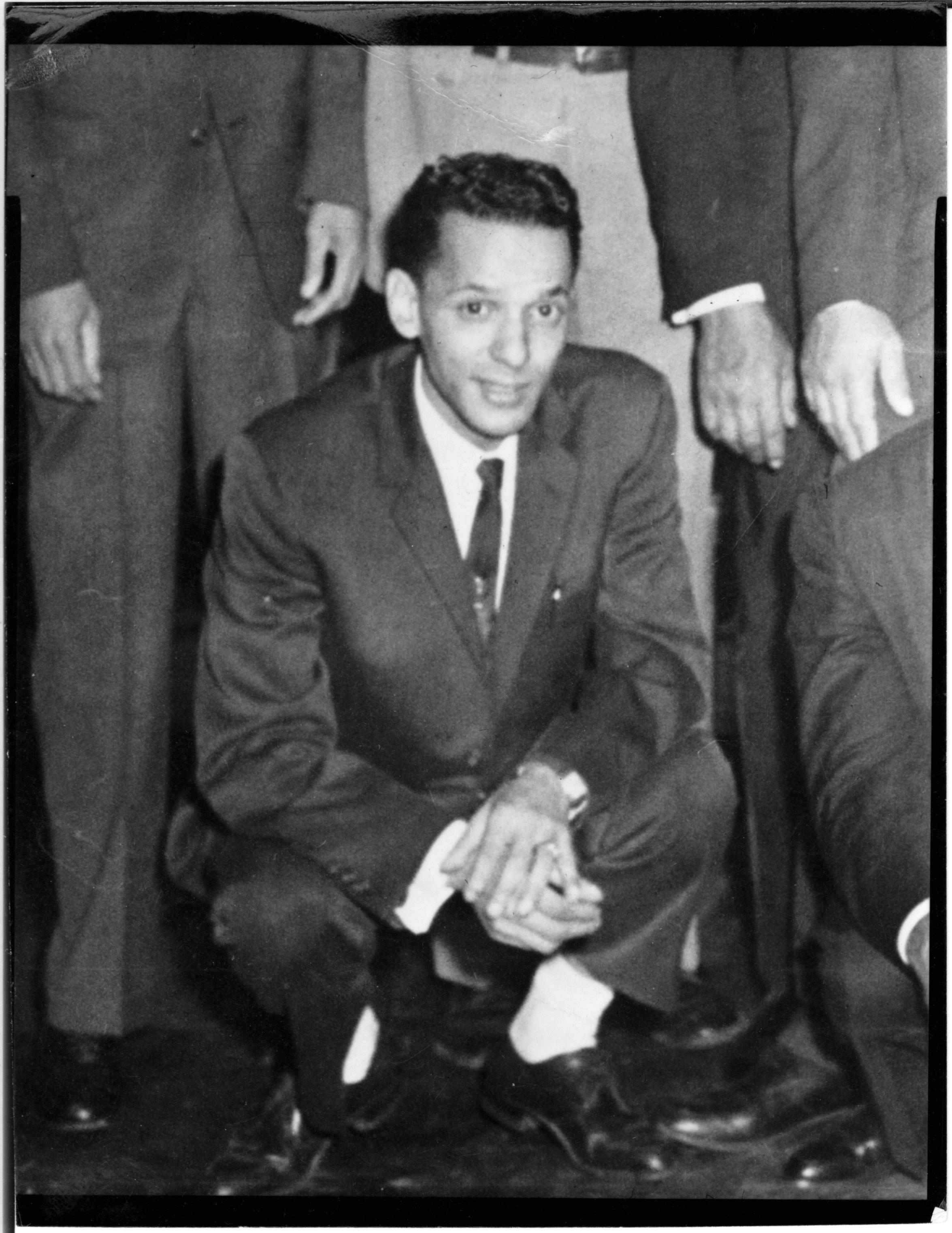
Stanley Thomas, Jr in 1955.

The Pythodd began as a meeting house for the Knights of Pythias and Odd Fellows, two benevolent societies with chapters in the Rochester region in the 1930s. In 1942, it became a membership based club meeting space.

Around 1953, the benevolent societies sold the land and the Pythodd became a music venue open to the public. When the club opened to the public after 1953, it was originally managed by jazz singer Jon Hendricks’ brother, Stewart Hendricks and Roy King. In 1965, Hendricks and King handed the management of the Pythodd over to the Thomas family, a well-known and influential family in the Rochester community. Stanley Thomas, Sr. was a long-time leader and civil rights pioneer in business and government and a leader in multiple social and fraternal organizations. His son, Stanley Thomas, Jr., worked for the club from the late 1950s until he took over as manager in 1967 when his family purchased the club. Working with his mother Mrs. Delores Thomas, Stan Jr. reopened the club for business after a brief closure and operated from 1968 to 1973.

Throughout the 1950s and 60s the Pythodd was one of the most popular jazz venues in Western New York, rivaling major venues in New York City and across the country. The Pythodd was located on the corner of Troup and Clarissa Streets in the thriving Black community of the Third Ward in the Southwest Quadrant of the city of Rochester. Its location is significant since the Clarissa Street community, where Frederick Douglass first published his North Star newspaper out of the Memorial AME Zion Church, was especially vibrant and booming following World War II. The Pythodd itself was one of the many Black-owned businesses on Clarissa Street that provided the Third Ward with entertainment and charm. The Pythodd was also a key stop on the Chitlin' Circuit, a network of mostly Black jazz venues around the United States that welcomed Black performers during and in turn fostered the American jazz scene during an era of racial segregation. In his 2012 interview for the Smithsonian Jazz Oral History Program, saxophonist Lou Donaldson described touring from New York to California as "The greatest circuit in the world... We started in Rochester at a place called the Pythodd" for a one-week residency and then would move on the Buffalo, Cleveland, Chicago, with stops all the way to San Francisco and Oakland.

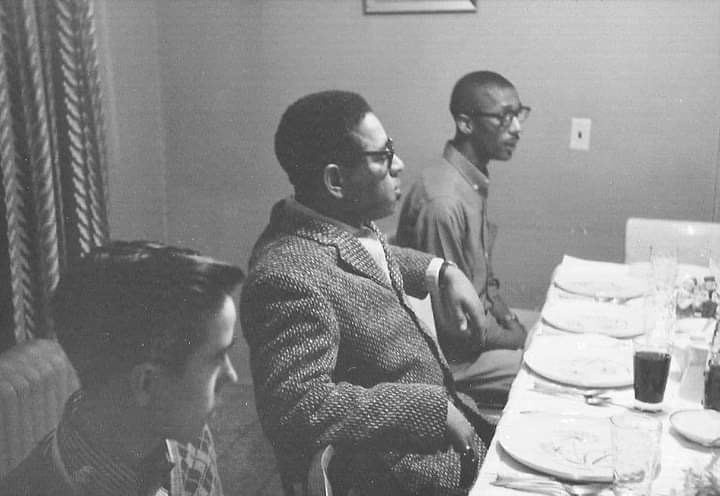
Musicians Dizzy Gillespie and Ron Carter enjoying a meal at the home of Chuck and Gap Mangione's parents. The Jazz Brothers was the Pythodd house band c. 1950s. (Image courtesy of Ron Carter)

In the early days of The Pythodd, the club itself was considered more of a community gathering place for the neighbors of Clarissa Street and the greater Third Ward that hosted jazz performances, not specifically a jazz club. In the 1950s and early 1960s, however, The Pythodd became both a meeting space for regulars as well as an intimate venue for jazz lovers from Rochester and beyond to watch up-and-coming musicians like George Benson, Ron Carter, Steve Gadd, the Jazz Brothers (Chuck and Gap Mangione’s group), Roy McCurdy, and Alice Coltrane. Paul Hoeffler, whose images appear in Ken Burns’ Jazz documentary miniseries, got his start as a jazz photographer at the Pythodd. Some of Hoeffler’s most iconic images taken at The Pythodd appear in biographical media about Pee Wee Ellis, and in Ron Carter’s documentary Finding the Right Notes where Carter and Ellis describe their formative years playing at The Pythodd.

The Pythodd’s thirty year history came to an end in the September 1973 due to urban renewal in the surrounding Clarissa Street neighborhood as well as a decline in the popularity of jazz among young people. As the audiences left the Pythodd, its management tried to resurrect it by hiring disco artists in an attempt to bolster the draw of the club, but eventually became unsuccessful. The Pythodd Room closed its doors in 1973, and it was eventually demolished and replaced with a parking lot. Music director Derrick Lucas for radio station Jazz 90.1 in Rochester, makes the point, "The Pythodd survived the riots in July 1964, but couldn’t survive urban renewal".

The cultural and social importance of the Pythodd went largely unremembered except by those who vowed to keep the spirit of the Pythodd alive. Beginning in the late 1980s, the Pythodd Jazz Reunion ran for seven years before merging with the inaugural Clarissa Street Reunion in 1996.

== Legacy ==
Wider interest in remembering the cultural impact of the Clarissa Street neighborhood and legacy as Rochester’s version of Black Wall Street, resulting in a renewed interest in the Pythodd and the legacy of jazz in Rochester. With this renewed interest, researchers and various community organizations in Rochester began to look more into the history and legacy of the Pythodd. Contemporary examples include Tina Chapman’s film, Remembering the Pythodd (2013).

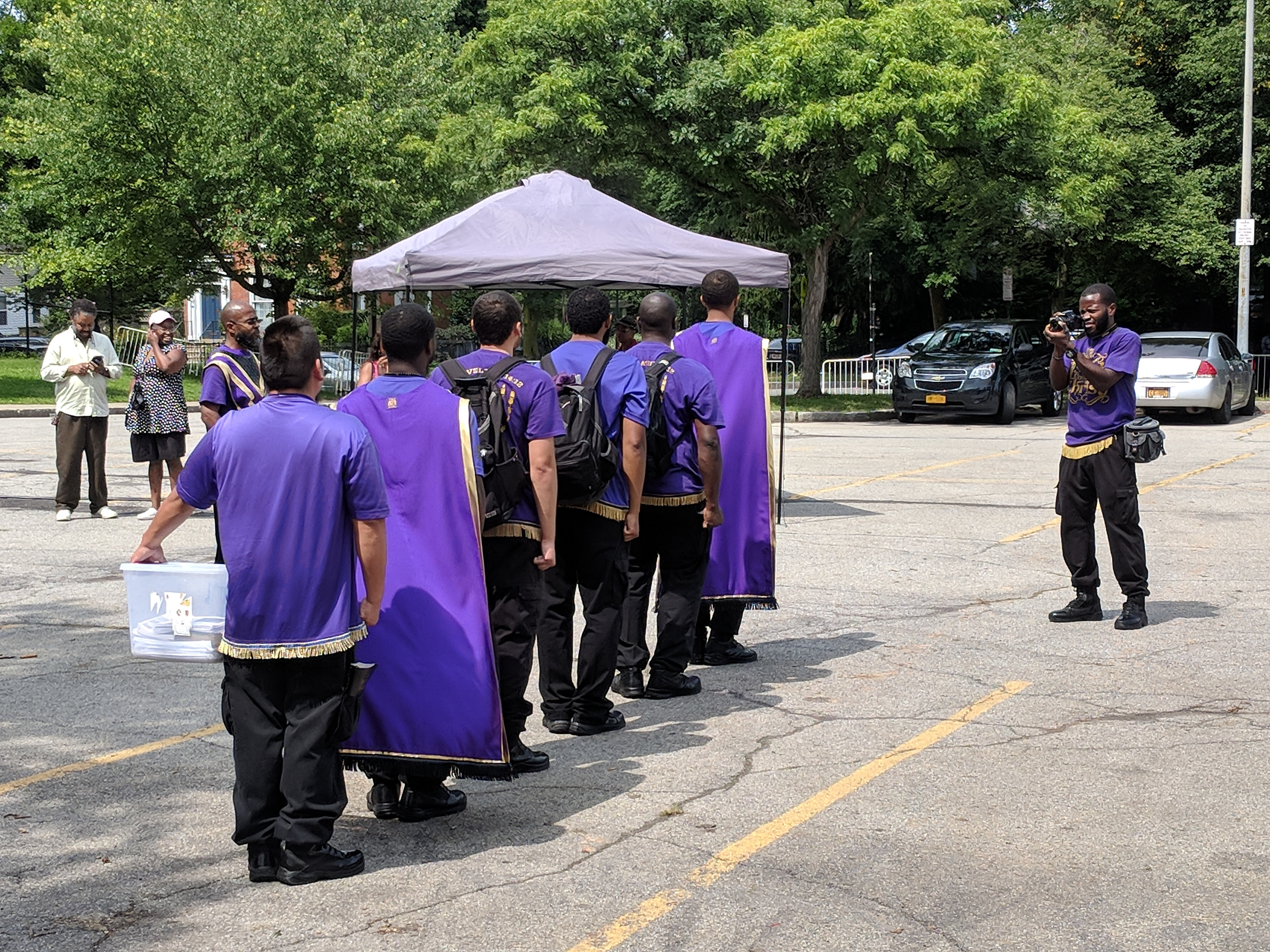
Clarissa Street Reunion 2018

The Clarissa Street Reunion celebrates the area's history.

Since 2019, through a partnership between The Center for Teen Empowerment and the Clarissa Street Reunion Committee (now known as Clarissa Street Legacy), Youth History Ambassadors, and elders who grew up in the neighborhood created Clarissa Uprooted. They recorded oral histories, created a documentary that won multiple national media and film festival awards. These partners also researched and designed a museum-quality exhibit to share Clarissa Street’s history and its lessons with the next generation. A full-sized replica of The Pythodd stage forms a centerpiece of the Clarissa Uprooted exhibit.

In 2020, the Public History course at the University of Rochester created a website dedicated to chronicling and digitally archiving the history of Jazz in Rochester and the Pythodd Room called "The Spirit of the Pythodd".

In the summer and fall of 2023, Teen Empowerment Rochester, along with local artists, youth, and elders, commissioned a mural to be painted on the I-490 overpass over Main Street in Rochester to commemorate the Pythodd and Clarissa Street neighborhood.

== See also ==
- History of Rochester, New York
- 1964 Urban Rebellion (Rochester, NY)
