= Fernwood Park Historic District =

Historic district in New York, United States

- U.S. National Register of Historic Places
- U.S. Historic district
- Location within New York Location within the United States
- Location: Bounded by Fernwood Ave., Woodman Park, Culver Rd., and Waring Rd., Rochester, New York
- Coordinates: 43°10′48″N 77°33′45″W
- Area: 10 acres (4.0 ha)
- Built: 1947
- Architect: Barrows, C. Storrs; Gott, Francis Hastings
- Architectural style: Colonial Revival
- MPS: Rochester Plan Veterans Housing MPS
- NRHP reference No.: 10000360
- Added to NRHP: June 21, 2010

Fernwood Park Historic District is a national historic district located in the northeast quadrant of Rochester in Monroe County, New York. The district consists of 40 contributing buildings and one contributing site. The garden apartment complex was originally built in 1947 as part of the Rochester Plan to provide quality, low rent housing for veterans returning from World War II and their families. There are 38 two story garden style apartment buildings and one pair of garage units with 36 garages. There are a total of 152 apartments, or four per building, with the buildings grouped in three clusters. The buildings are in a vernacular Colonial Revival style. It is one of three complexes built as part of the Rochester Plan; the others are Norton Village and Ramona Park.

It was listed on the National Register of Historic Places in 2010.

== Gallery ==
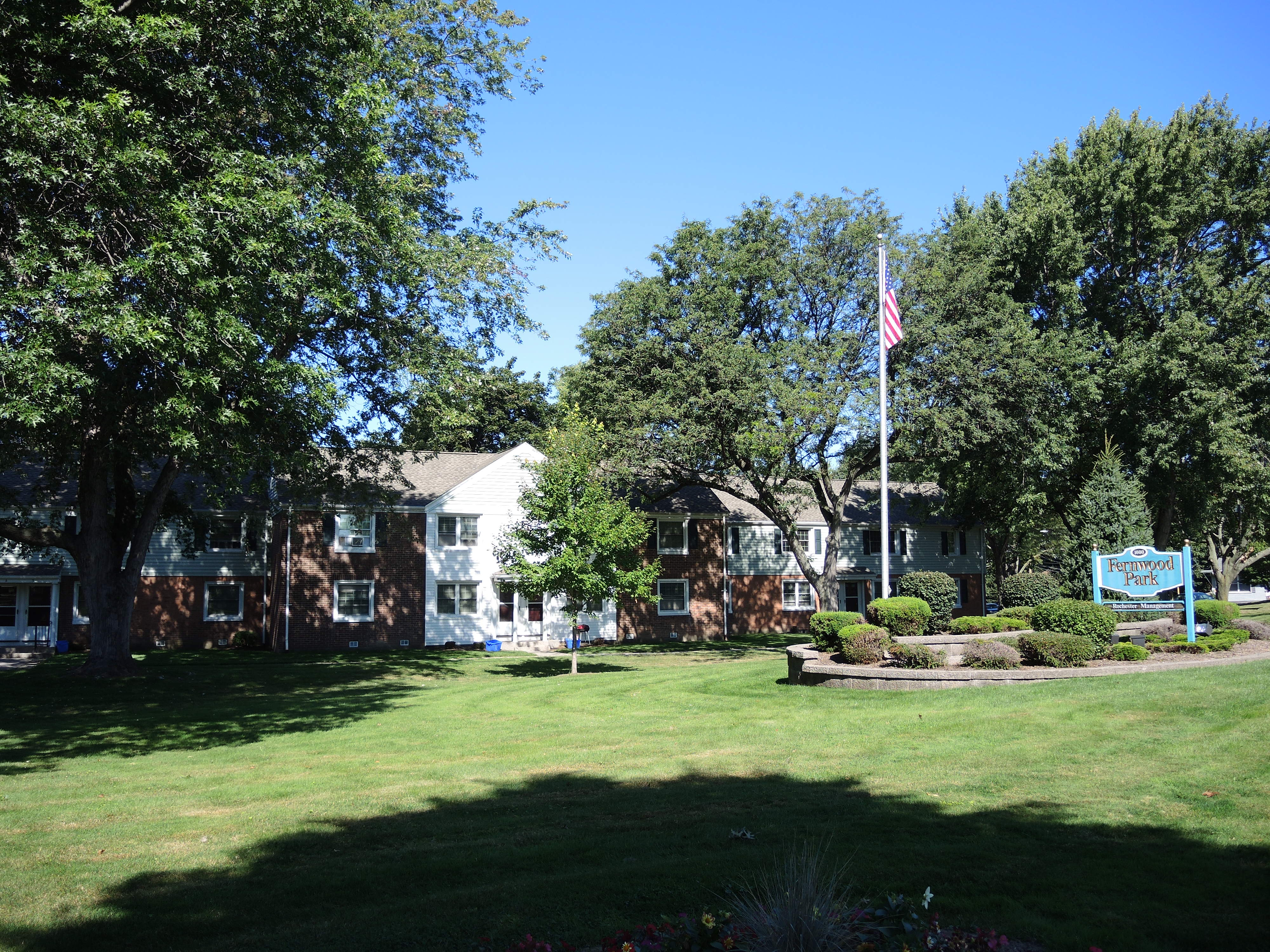
Front of complex

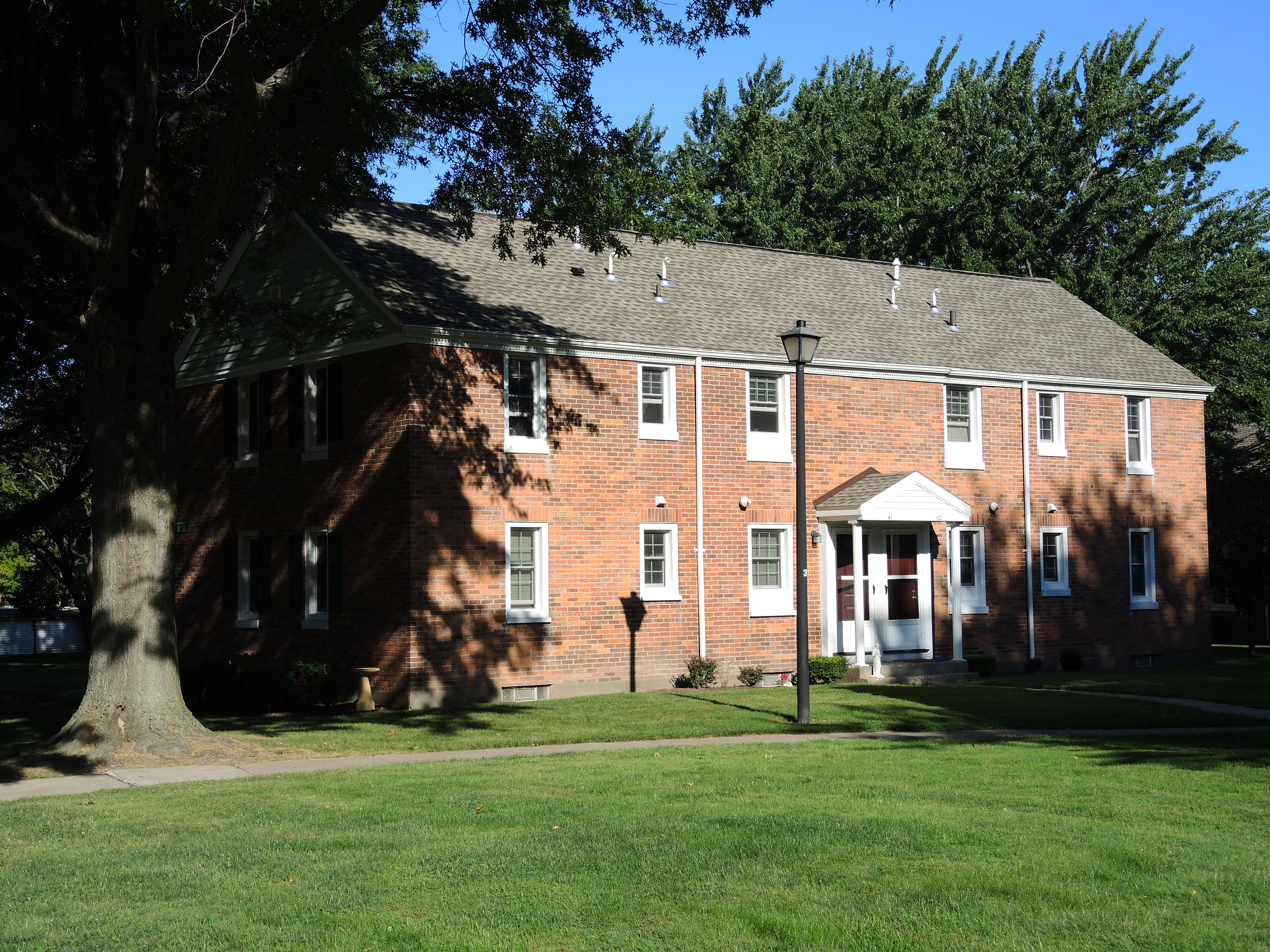
Units 41 and 42

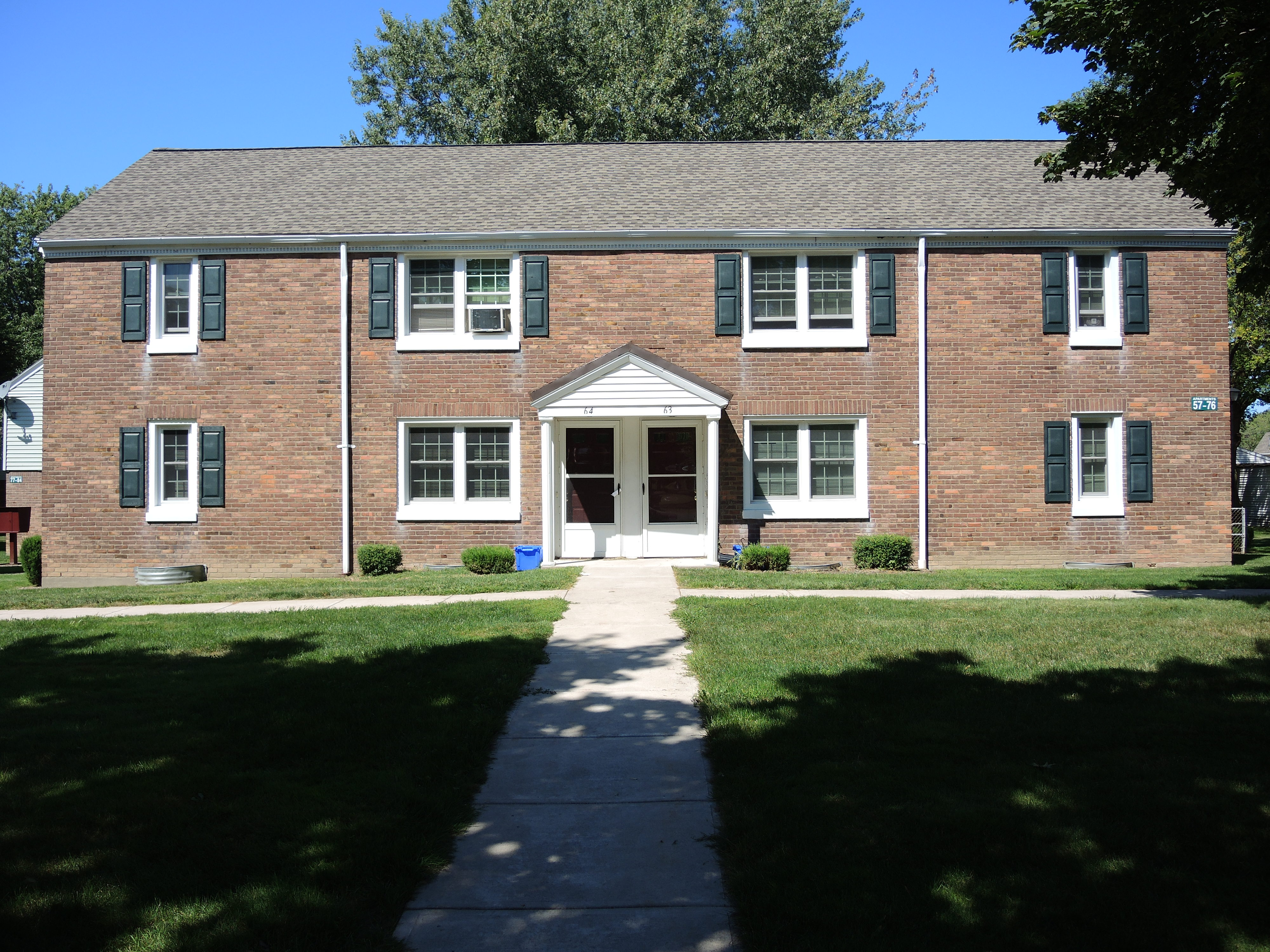
Units 63 and 64

== See also ==
- National Register of Historic Places listings in Rochester, New York
