= Hillside Family of Agencies =

US non-profit organization

- Company type: Human Services non-profit
- Founded: Rochester, New York (1836)
- Headquarters: Rochester, New York, U.S.
- Number of locations: New York and Maryland
- Key people: Maria Cristalli (President and CEO)
- Services: non-secure detention, residential treatment, day treatment education, foster care, emergency services, outpatient mental health services, and customized services
- Operating income: 131,483,251
- Number of employees: 2,298 (2011)
- Website: hillside.com

Hillside Family of Agencies is one of the oldest family and youth non-profit human services organizations in Western and Central New York, US. The agency started as Rochester Female Association for the Relief of Orphans and Destitute Children in 1837. The first year 46 children were served. The organization was renamed the Rochester Orphan Asylum in 1839, the organization constructed a larger facility in 1844 at Hubbell Park. In 1905 the group moved to the current Monroe Ave site. To reflect the shift from providing a home for orphans to caring for "dependent and neglected children," the Rochester Orphan Asylum changed its name in 1921 to Hillside Home for Children. Another name change came in 1940 when Hillside Children's Center was adopted and a goal set: "for every child, a fair chance for the development of a healthy personality".
During World War II Hillside Children's Center worked with Eastman Kodak to help the children of Kodak employees in England. Between 1940 and 1942, 156 British children were brought to the Rochester area by Kodak to safeguard them from the war in their home country. Hillside assisted in placing these "Kodakids," as they were called, with the families of local Kodak employees or in foster homes for the duration of the war.

In 1965, Hillside broadened its mission to helping "dependent, neglected, learning disabled, emotionally disturbed, socially maladjusted, and delinquent" children. During the 1970s, Hillside Children's Center experienced great growth. The institution began its conversion to a residential treatment center and reopened its campus school, which had been closed since 1931. In 1996 a new parent organization, Hillside Behavioral Health System (HBHS), was formed in order to provide services more efficiently and effectively. Hillside Children's Center and Hillside Children's Foundation served as partner affiliates. In 1996 the Wegmans Work Scholarship Connection joined Hillside to become Hillside Work Scholarship. In 1999, Hillside Behavioral Health System added to its family when Crestwood Children's Center and Crestwood Children's Foundation affiliated with it. Hillside Family of Agencies was adopted as the system name in December 2000 to better represent the diversity of services provided by each affiliate. In 2004 Hillside absorbed Snell Farms Children's Center and Adoption Resource Network, Inc.

Headquartered in Rochester, New York, the organization works with youth and families facing a wide range of behavioral and emotional challenges. Hillside Family of Agencies employs more than 2,200 staff working out of multiple in New York and Maryland and Washington, D.C. 12,636 families are served by HFA.

== Affiliates ==
Hillside Family of Agencies comprises the following affiliates:

- Crestwood Children's Center – Supports children ages birth through age 21 and their families with an array of child welfare, behavioral, mental health, and family development services. The main campus of Crestwood Children's Center is located near Rochester, New York.
- Crestwood Children's Foundation – Raises funds to support the programs of Crestwood Children's Center.
- Hillside Children's Center – Provides early intervention and customized services for children and families in Auburn, New York, and Rochester, New York
- Hillside Children's Foundation – Fund-raising for the Hillside Children's Center and Hillside Work-Scholarship Connection
- Hillside Work-Scholarship Connection – Provides educational assistance and job training for young adults starting in grades 7–9
- Snell Farm Children's Center – Specialized residential treatment for boys, near Bath, New York

== Operating budget and funding ==
The Hillside Family of Agencies operates on a total budget of $103 million (2006). It receives about 95% of its funds from government agencies for services provided, 1% from the United Way and 4% from other sources.

== AdaptaCare cottage ==
A recent innovation is the AdaptaCare Cottage. This is a residential cottage design that adapts to the varying needs of service agencies. The cottage provides a home-like non-institutional look-and-feel in 6-, 8- and 10-bed designs, ranging in size from 3100 to over 4,000 square feet (370 m^{2}). It complies with the most stringent NYS requirements, including safety and security.

== Hillside Work Scholarship ==
In 1987, Wegmans founded the Wegmans Work Scholarship Connection to teach at risk youth the skills they need to succeed and help reduce the high school dropout rate in the Rochester City School district. Wegmans provides part-time employment and workplace mentors for these students needing additional support. The program has a graduation rate of 80% while the standard Rochester City School District has a graduation rate of about 50%.
