= Norton Village Historic District =

Historic district in New York, United States

- U.S. National Register of Historic Places
- U.S. Historic district
- Location within New York Location within the United States
- Location: Norton St., Norton Village Ln., Village Way, and Veteran St., Rochester, New York
- Coordinates: 43°11′14″N 77°33′58″W
- Area: 18 acres (7.3 ha)
- Built: 1949
- Architect: Williamson, Herbert S.
- Architectural style: Colonial Revival
- MPS: Rochester Plan Veterans Housing MPS
- NRHP reference No.: 10000362
- Added to NRHP: June 21, 2010

Norton Village Historic District is a national historic district located in the northeast quadrant of Rochester in Monroe County, New York. The district consists of 144 contributing buildings. The garden apartment complex was originally built in 1949 as part of the Rochester Plan to provide quality, low-rent housing for veterans returning from World War II and their families. There are 144 two-story garden-style apartment buildings with a total of 288 two-story apartments, or two per building, with the buildings grouped in four main clusters. The buildings are in a vernacular Colonial Revival style. It is one of three complexes built as part of the Rochester Plan; the others are Fernwood Park and Ramona Park.

It was listed on the National Register of Historic Places in 2010.

== Gallery ==
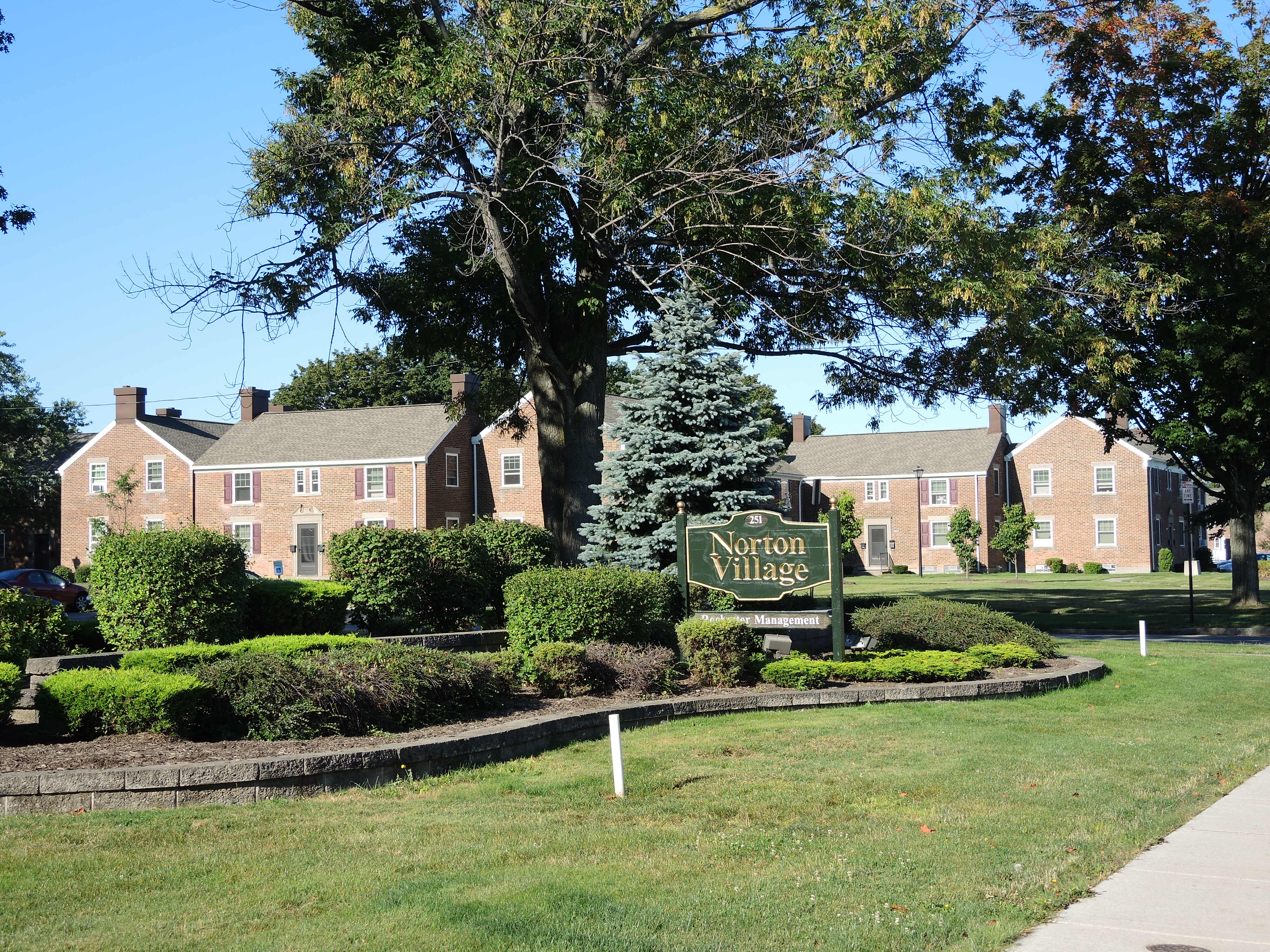
View from Norton Street

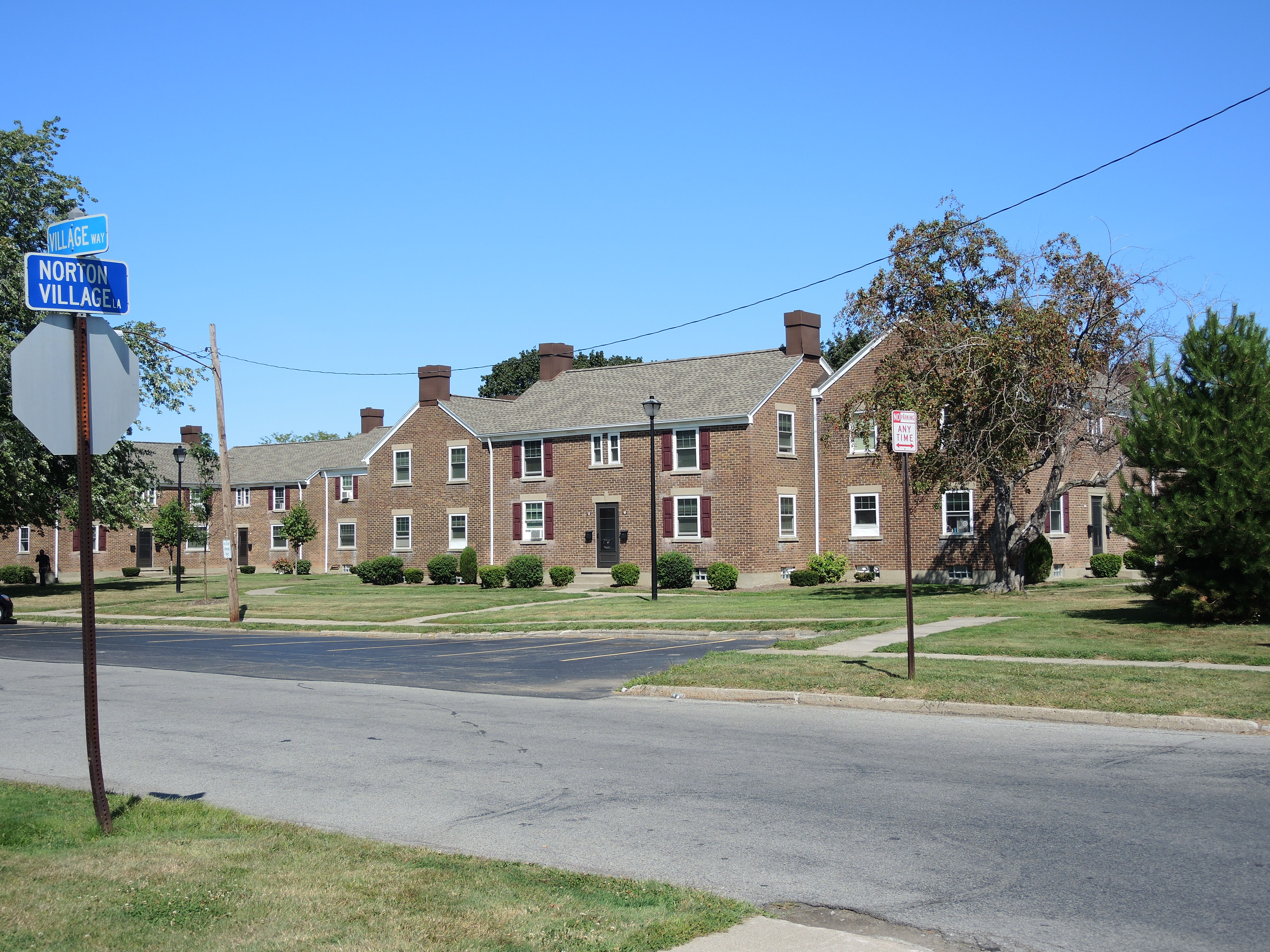
Units at 10 and 12 Village Way

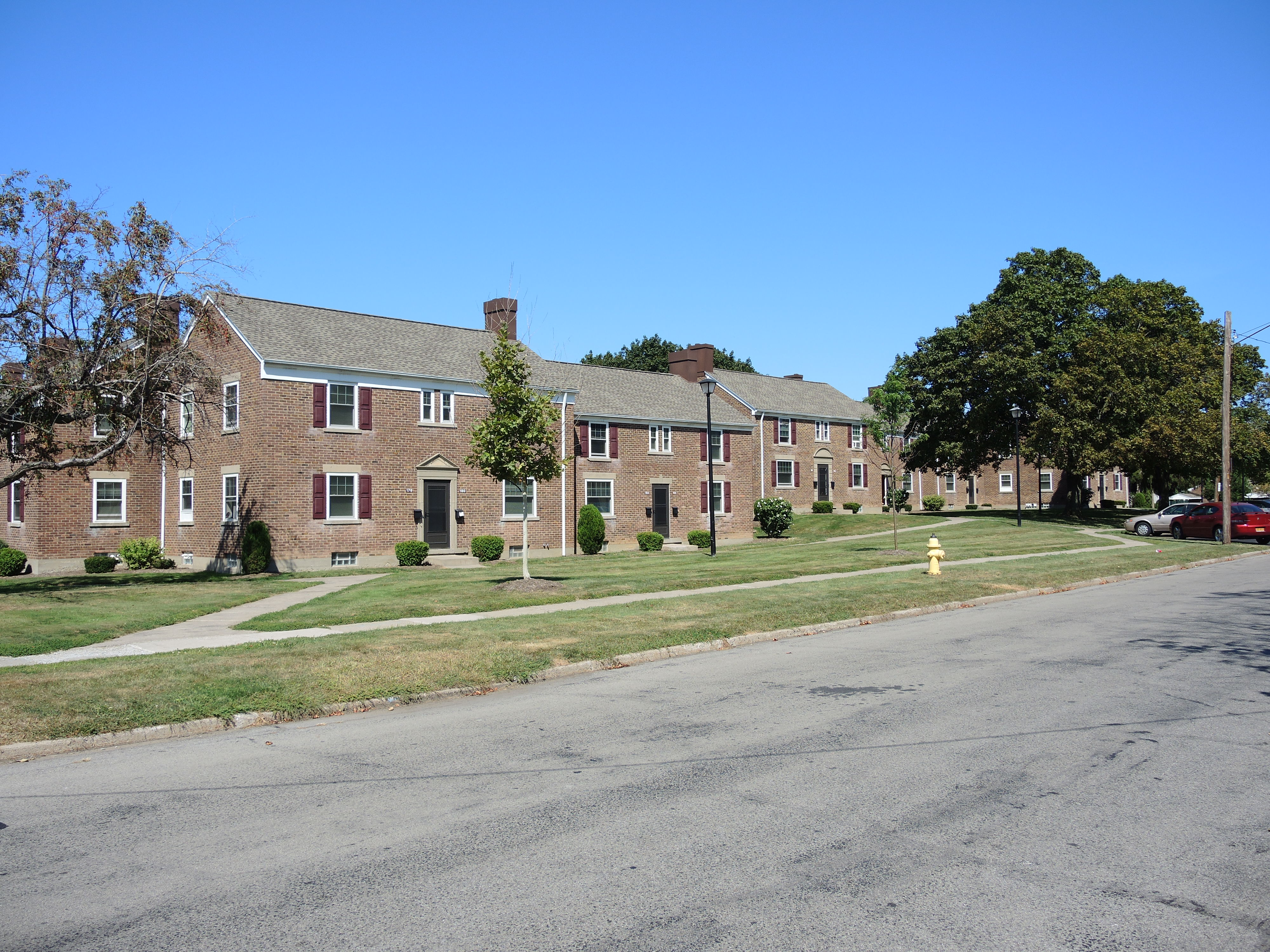
Units at 178, 180, 182, 184, 186, and 188 Norton Village Lane

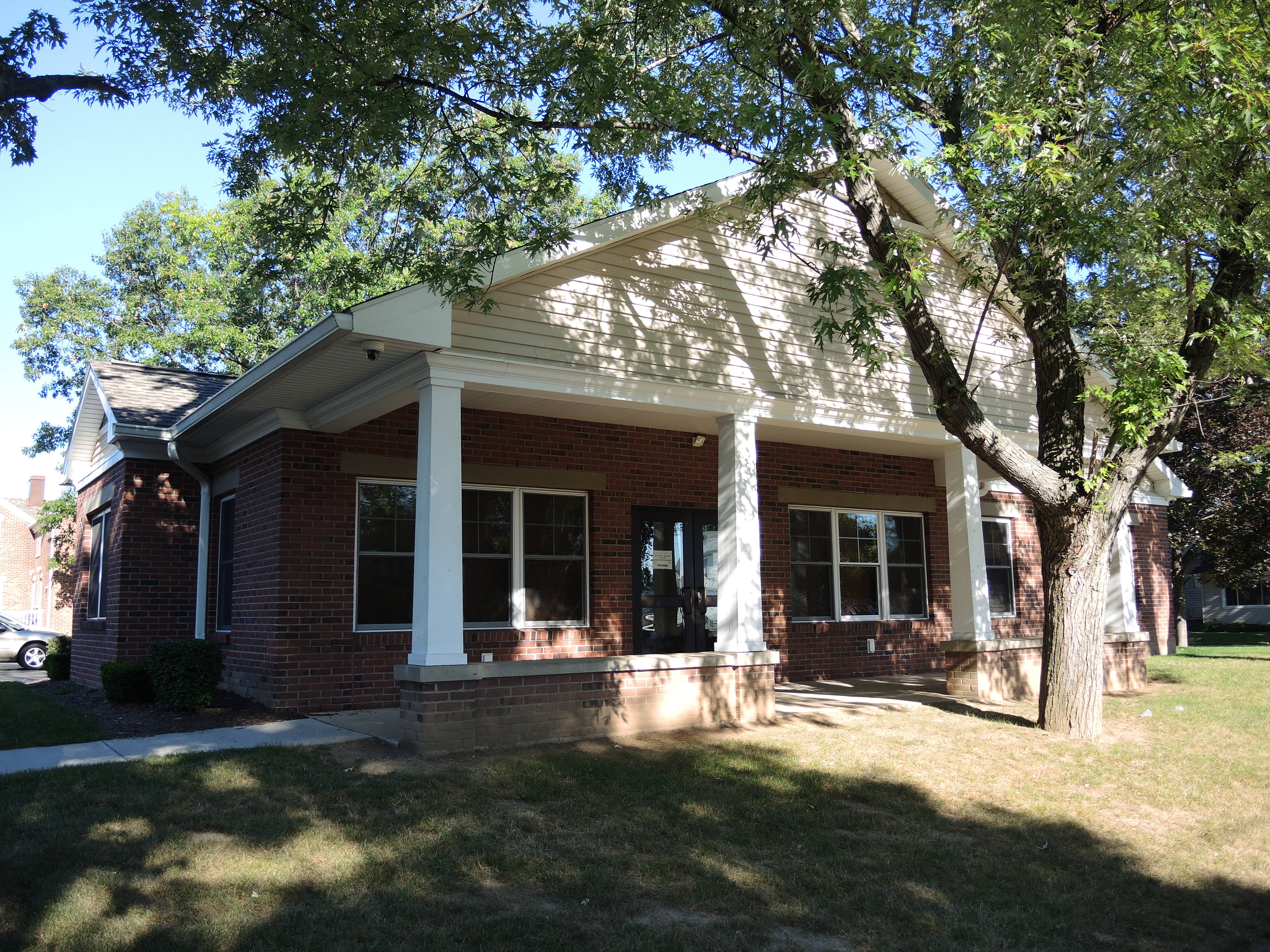
Community center (non-contributing)

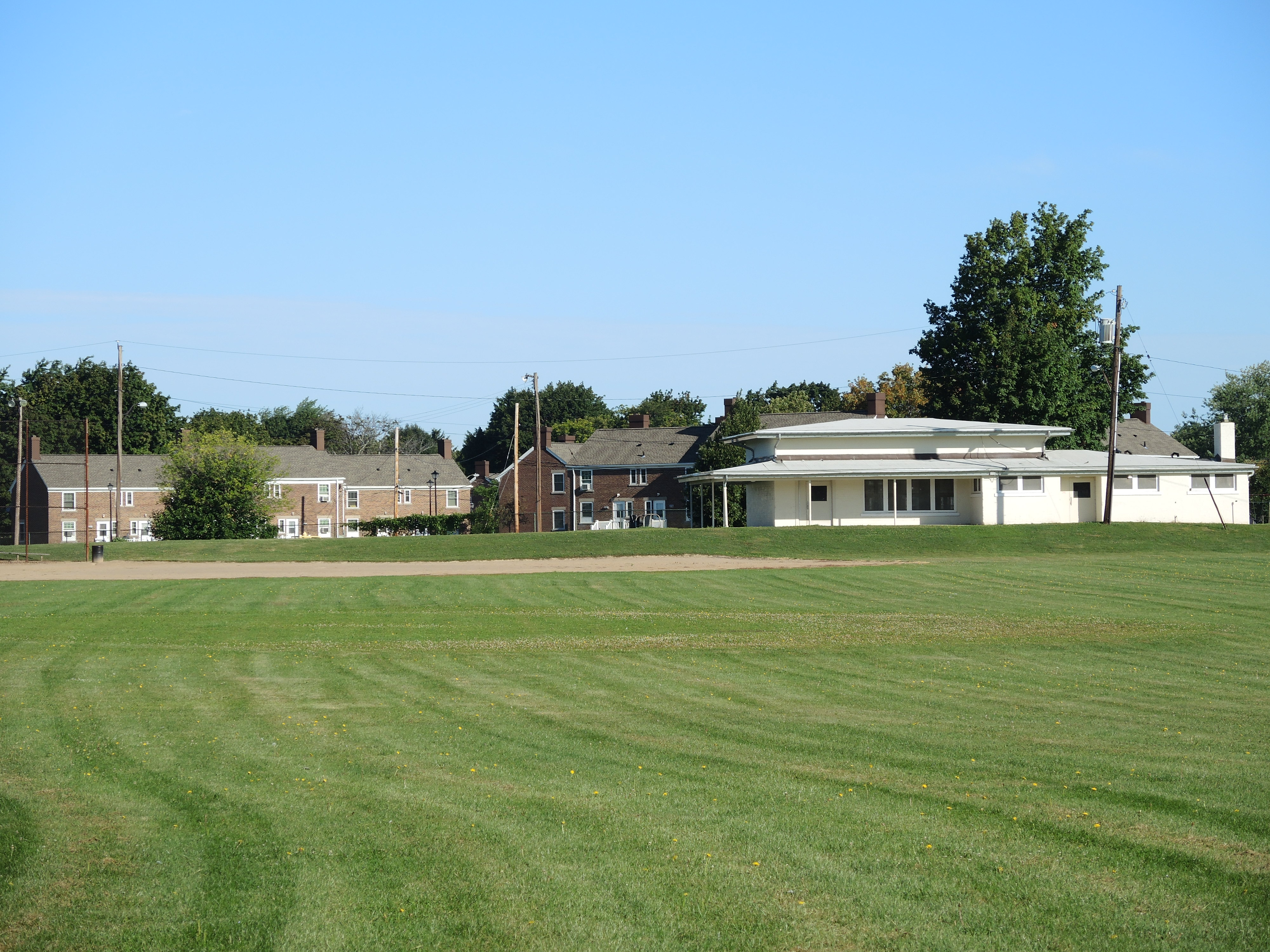
Recreation center
