= Paul Hoeffler =

Paul Hoeffler (1 November 1937 – 30 July 2005) was a photographer who worked in Rochester, New York, New York City, and Toronto, Canada. Hoeffler is mostly known for his photographs of the American Jazz scene of the 1950s and 1960s and of Jazz icons such as Louis Armstrong, Duke Ellington, Nat King Cole, Oscar Peterson, Jimmy Smith, Count Basie, Sarah Vaughan and Billie Holiday. He also had a great passion for classical music and cultivated a close friendship with the conductor Leopold Stokowski, whom he photographed on many occasions during performances and in private.

Paul Hoeffler gained a BFA in photography at the Rochester Institute of Technology (RIT), where he studied under the supervision of Minor White. After his graduation in 1959, Hoeffler moved to New York, where he worked as a master printer in a studio while building his career as a photographer. He later started his own studio and worked for various magazines, including fashion magazines, and took up wide commercial and artistic assignments. Prestigious record companies such as Verve, Mercury, Prestige and Blue Note commissioned Hoeffler for numerous album covers.

He moved to Toronto, Canada in 1971, where he carried on with his passion for photographing musicians, festivals and clubs. He produced a few CDs, hosted a radio show and taught at Humber College and Ryerson University. His previous teaching experience was at the Parson's school of Design in New York.

Many of Hoeffler's photographs feature in the 2000 Emmy Awards-nominated documentary by Ken Burns, "Jazz".

Paul Hoeffler died of cancer in 2005.

In 2011, Paul was inducted into the Rochester (NY) Music Hall of Fame as a charter member.
