= Ramona Park Historic District =

Historic district in New York, United States

- U.S. National Register of Historic Places
- U.S. Historic district
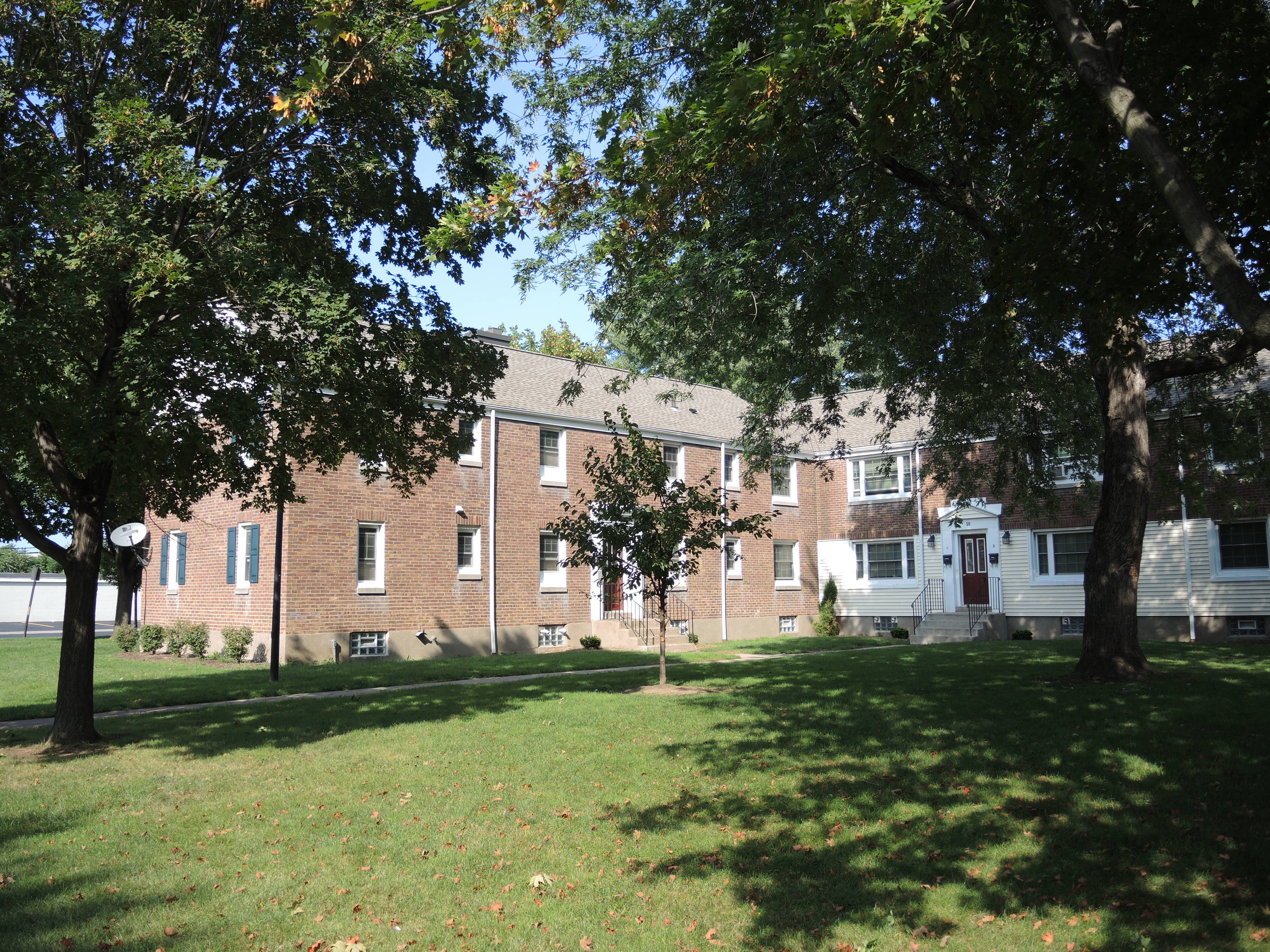
- North wing of unit 50 in the Ramona Park Apartments in Rochester, New York, September 2013

- Location within New York Location within the United States
- Location: Ramona Park, Rochester, New York
- Coordinates: 43°11′50″N 77°39′6″W
- Area: 10 acres (4.0 ha)
- Built: 1948
- Architect: Barrows, C. Storrs
- Architectural style: Colonial Revival
- MPS: Rochester Plan Veterans Housing MPS
- NRHP reference No.: 10000363
- Added to NRHP: June 21, 2010

Ramona Park Historic District is a national historic district located in the northwest quadrant of Rochester in Monroe County, New York. The district consists of 40 contributing buildings. The garden apartment complex was originally built in 1947 as part of the Rochester Plan to provide quality, low rent housing for veterans returning from World War II and their families. There are 34 two story garden style apartment buildings and two groups of garage units. There are a total of 136 apartments, or four per building, with the buildings grouped in 10 clusters. The buildings are in a vernacular Colonial Revival style. It is one of three complexes built as part of the Rochester Plan; the others are Fernwood Park and Norton Village.

It was listed on the National Register of Historic Places in 2010.

== Gallery ==
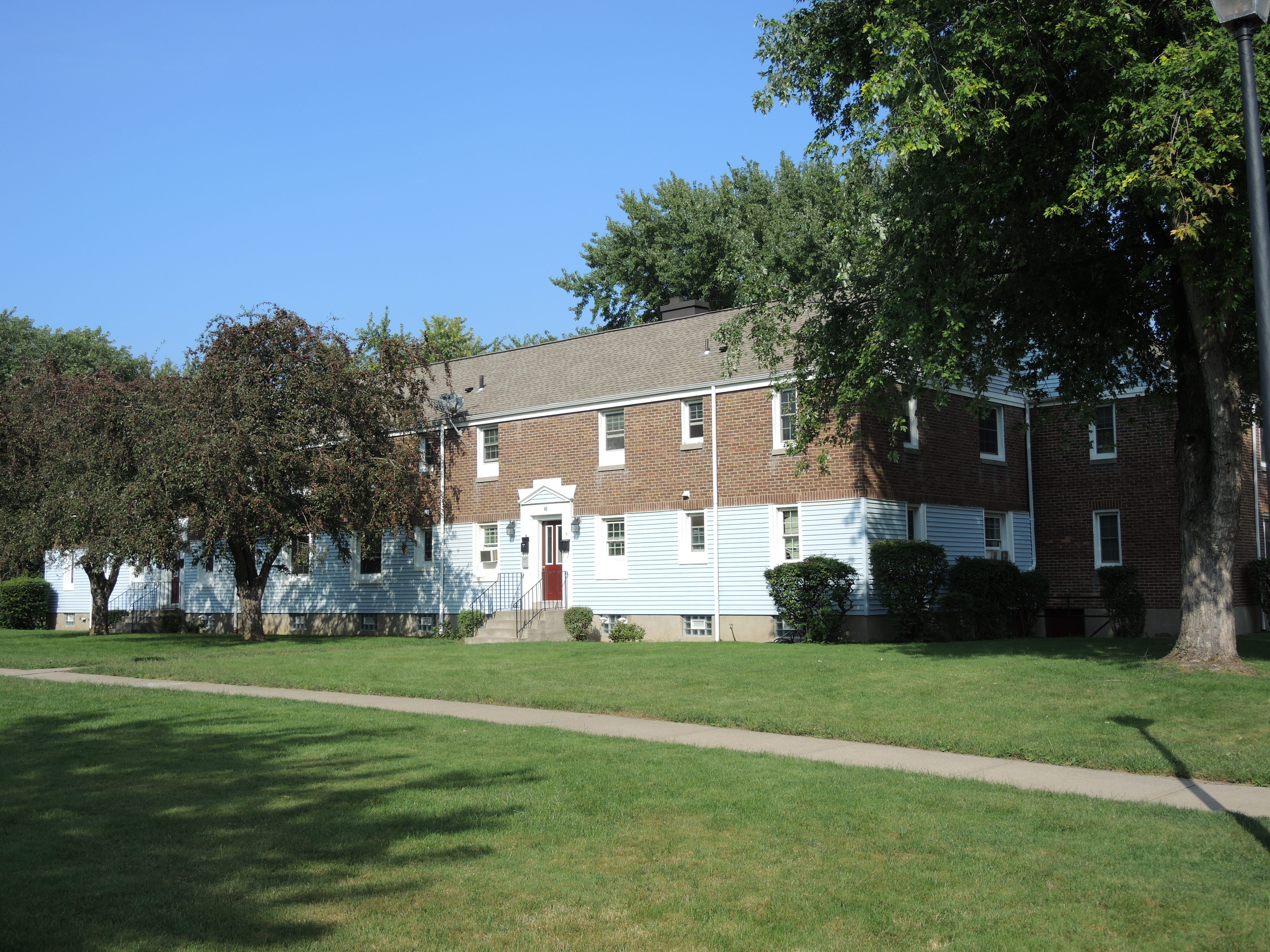
Unit 40

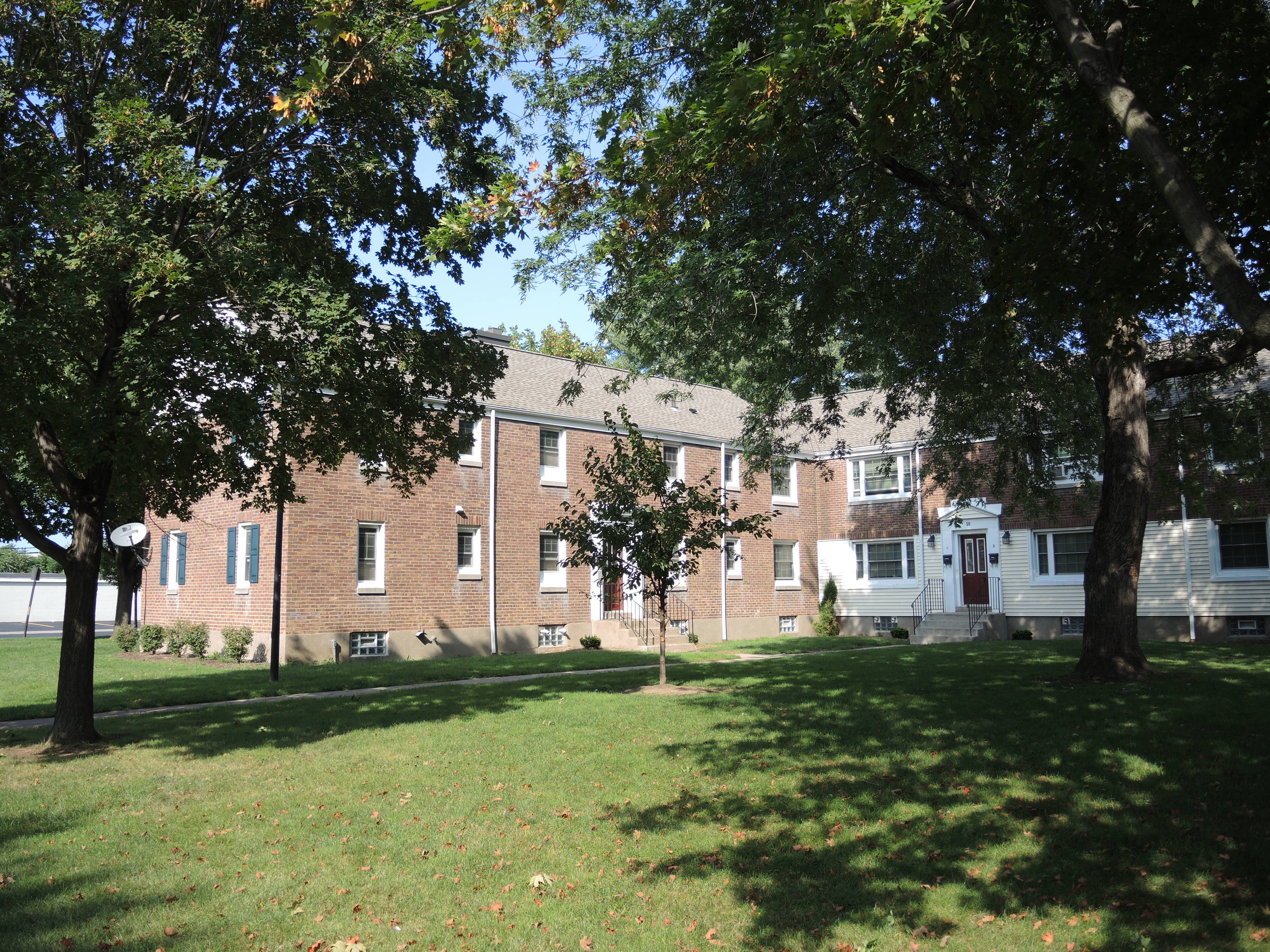
Unit 50 north wing

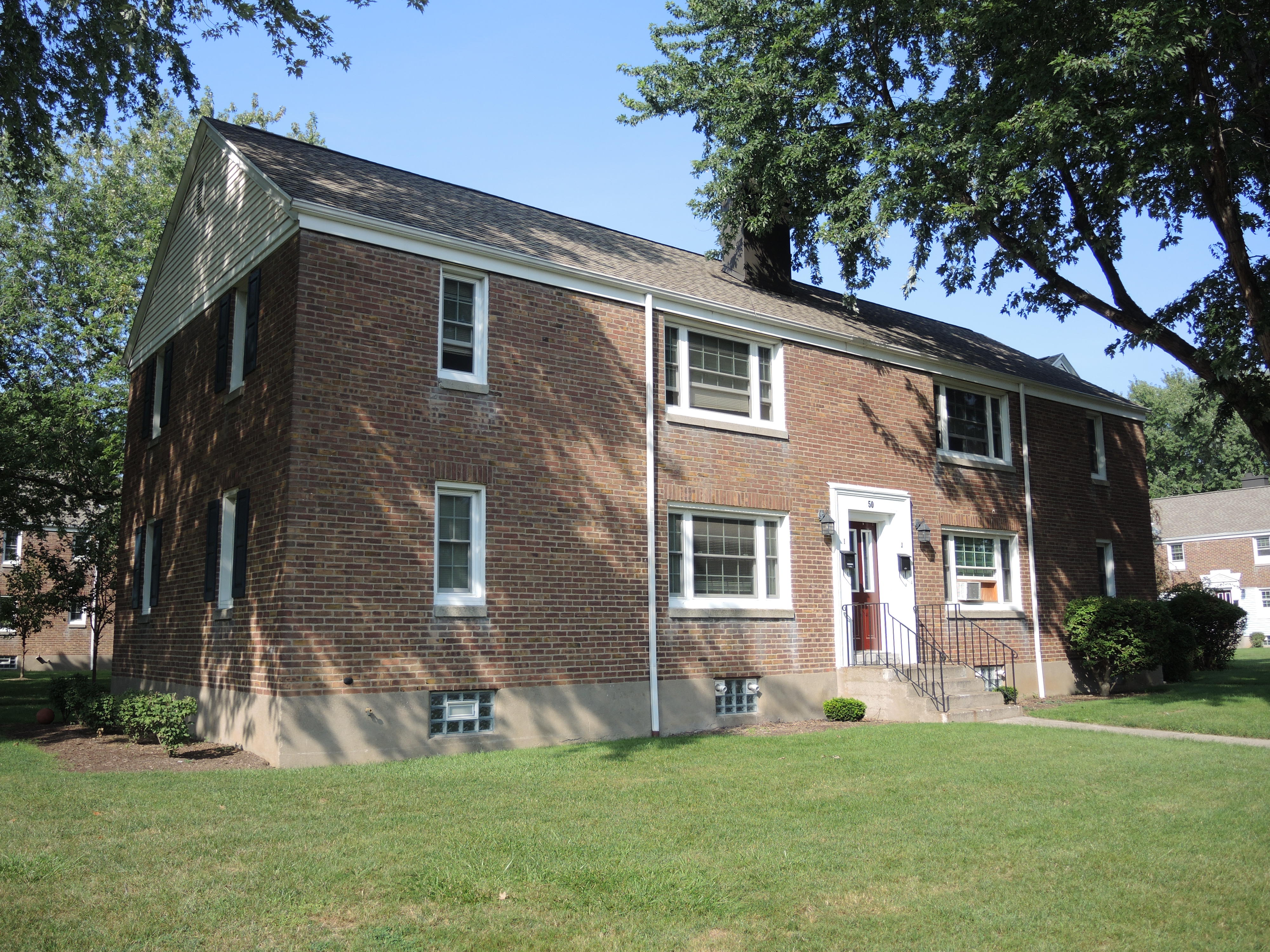
Unit 50 south wing

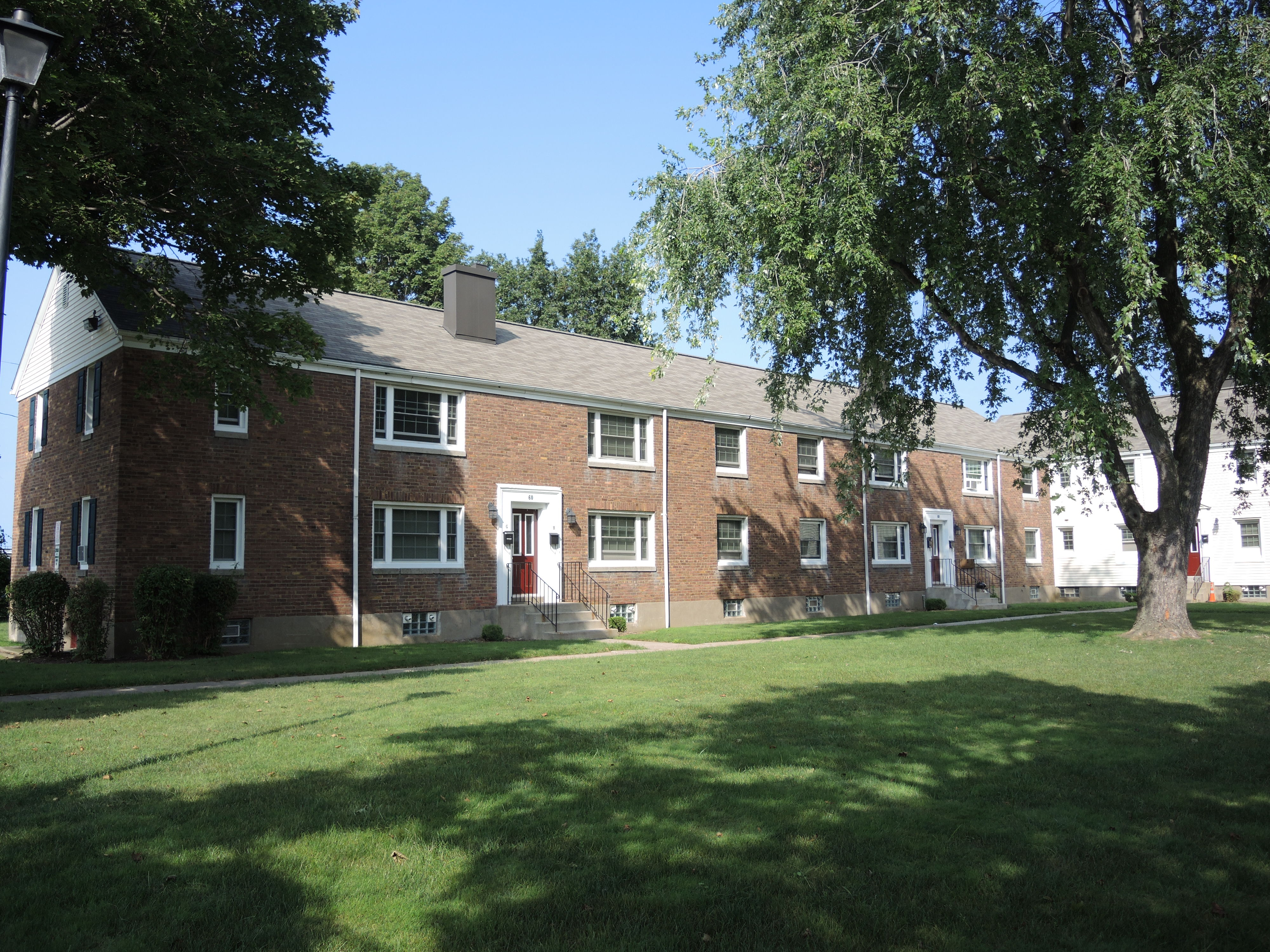
Unit 60

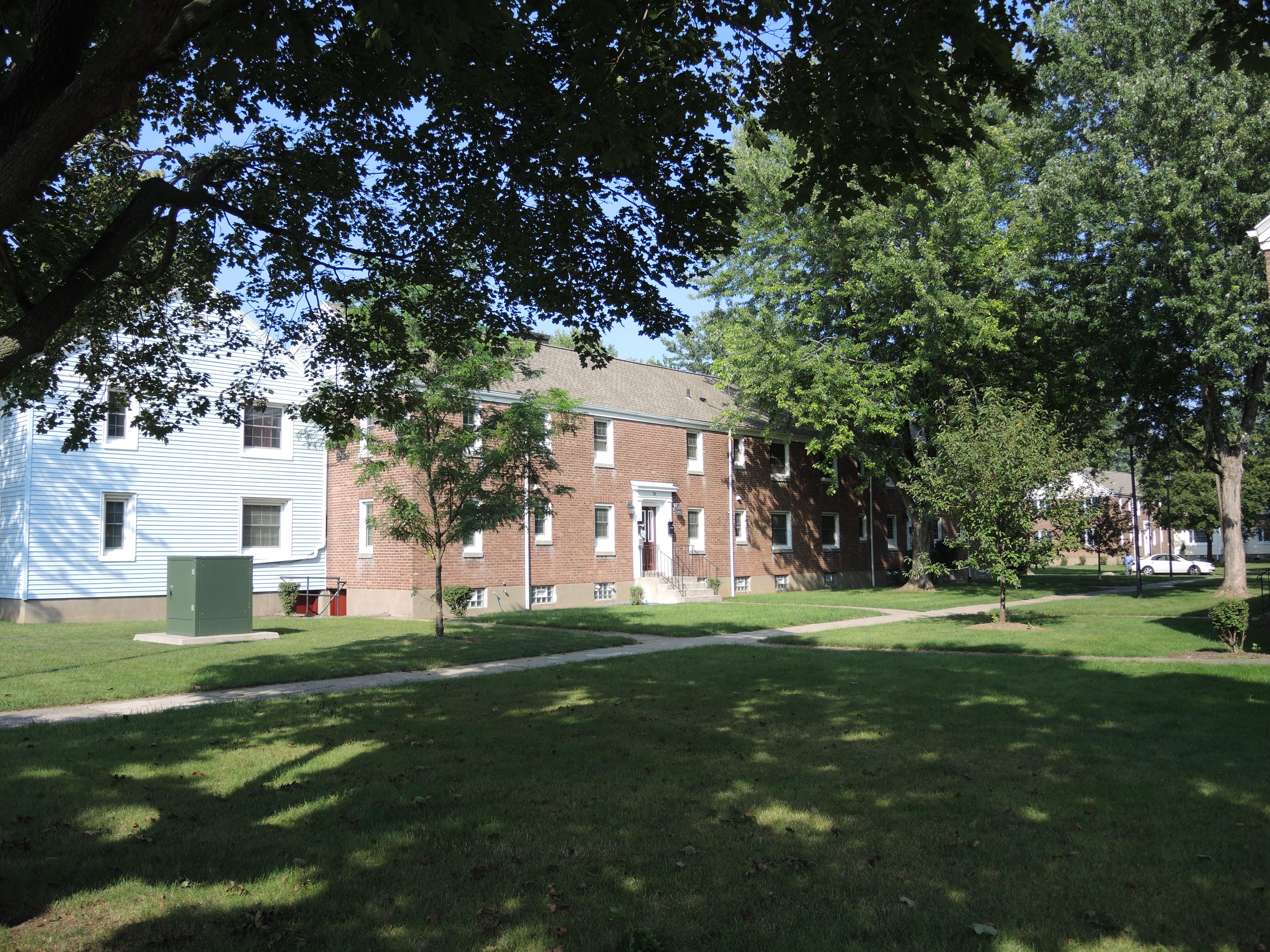
Unit 70

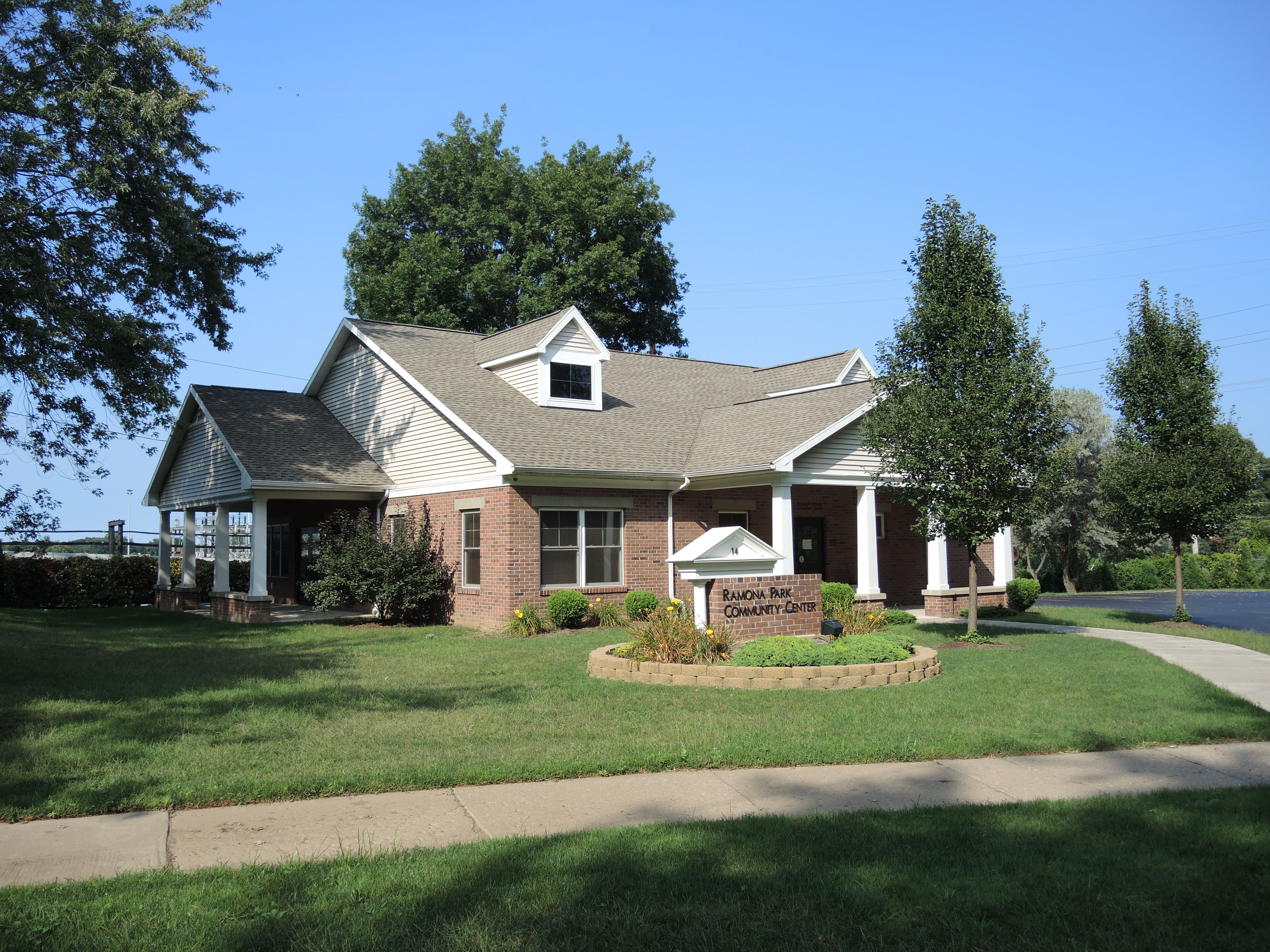
Community center (non-contributing)
