= William V. Madden =

American architect

- Born: June 25, 1868; Rochester, New York
- Died: November 17, 1921 (aged 53); Rochester, New York
- Occupation: Architect

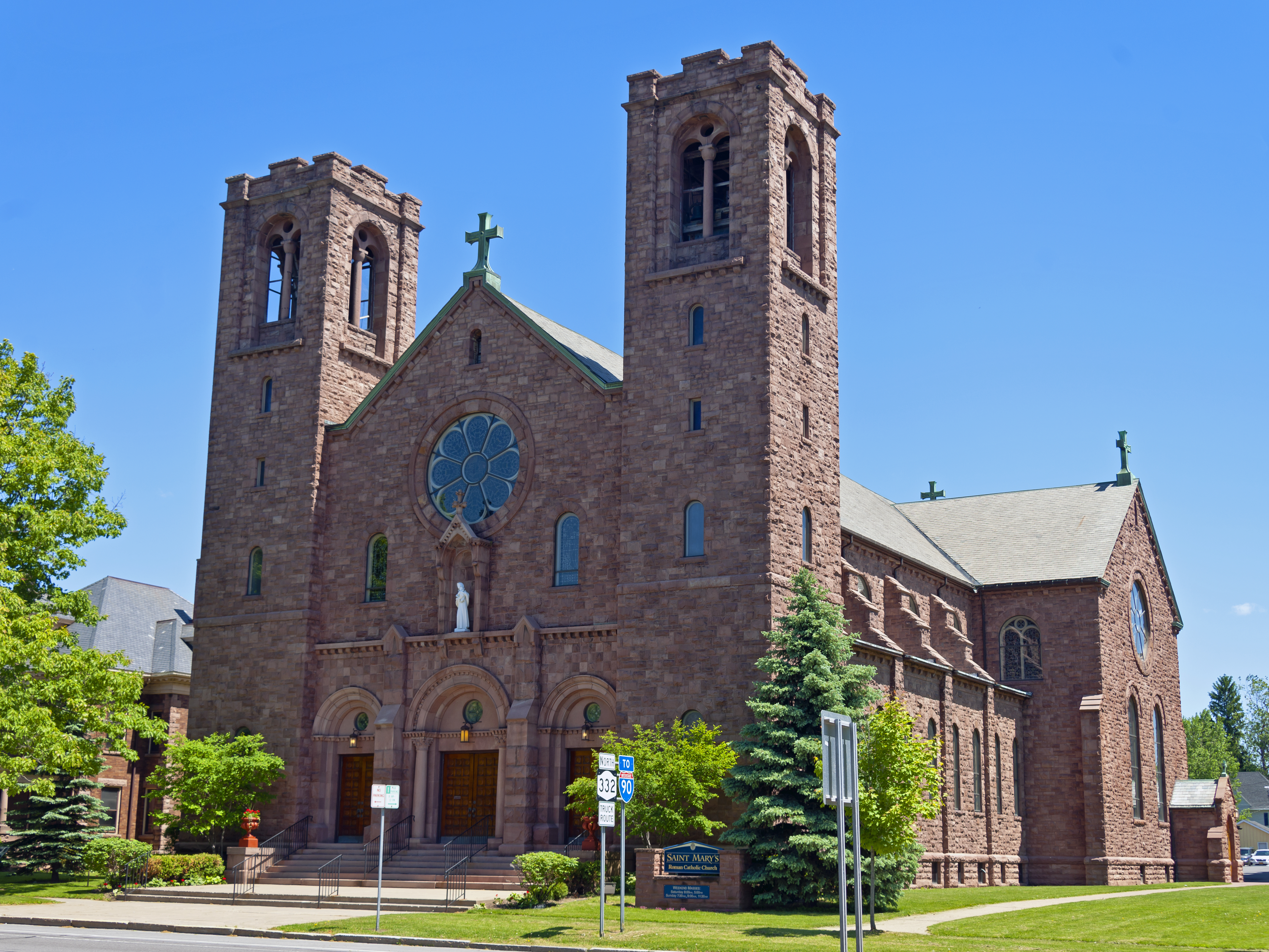
St. Mary's R. C. Church in Canandaigua, New York, designed by Gordon & Madden and completed in 1905.

William V. Madden (1868- 1921) was an American architect who designed a number of Catholic churches, schools, convents and rectories in Rochester, New York.

== Personal life ==
William V. Madden was born June 25, 1868, in Rochester, New York. He was educated in the local parochial and public schools with further instruction at the Mechanics' Institute, now Rochester Institute of Technology. He studied architecture in the offices of W. Foster Kelley and J. Foster Warner, the city's leading architect. He was then associated with contractor Thomas W. Finucane for five years, before forming the firm of Gordon & Madden with architect Edwin S. Gordon in 1902, who he had met working in Foster's office. Gordon and Madden worked together until 1918, when they dissolved their partnership. Gordon formed a new partnership, Gordon & Kaelber, and Madden established an independent practice. He continued to practice architecture for three more years until his death.

Gordon & Madden designed several projects for Kodak founder George Eastman, most prominently the former Eastman Dental Dispensary in Rochester, completed in 1917. They were also associated with the design of Kodak House in Kingsway, London, completed in 1911 with John James Burnet as architect of record.

Madden joined the American Institute of Architects in 1909. He died November 17, 1921, in Rochester.

== Architectural works ==
- Corpus Christi R. C. Church, Rochester, New York (1903)
- Convent (former) of Immaculate Conception R. C. Church, Rochester, New York (1905)
- St. Mary's R. C. Church, Canandaigua, New York (1905)
- Alterations to the rectory (former) of Immaculate Conception R. C. Church, Rochester, New York (1909)
- First Church of Christ, Scientist (former), Rochester, New York (1914–16)
- Eastman Dental Dispensary (former), Rochester, New York (1915–17, NRHP 1983)
