= Ulysses Ricci =

American sculptor

Ulysses Anthony Ricci (1888–1960) was an American sculptor known primarily for his architectural sculpture. Born in New York City, Ricci was an apprentice at the Perth Amboy Terra Cotta Works in New Jersey from 1902 to 1906.

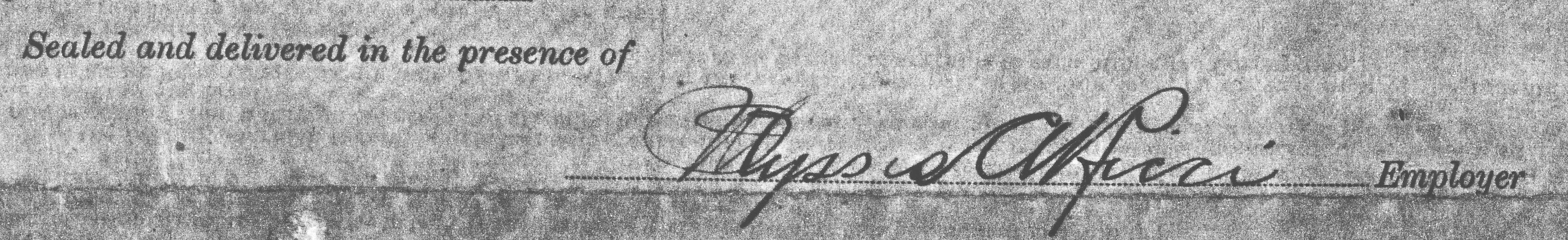
Ricci's signature from Corrado Parducci's apprenticeship papers

He studied at Cooper Union Institute and at the Art Students League with James Earle Fraser and George Bridgman. He opened his own studio in 1914 and was a partner in the firm Ricci & Zari from 1917 to 1941.

Ricci came to the attention of Karl Bitter when Bitter was head of sculpture decoration at the Panama–Pacific International Exposition which opened in 1915, where Ricci was commissioned to execute some of the sculptural decorations.

Architectural sculptor Corrado Parducci apprenticed with Ricci & Zari.

== Architectural Sculpture ==
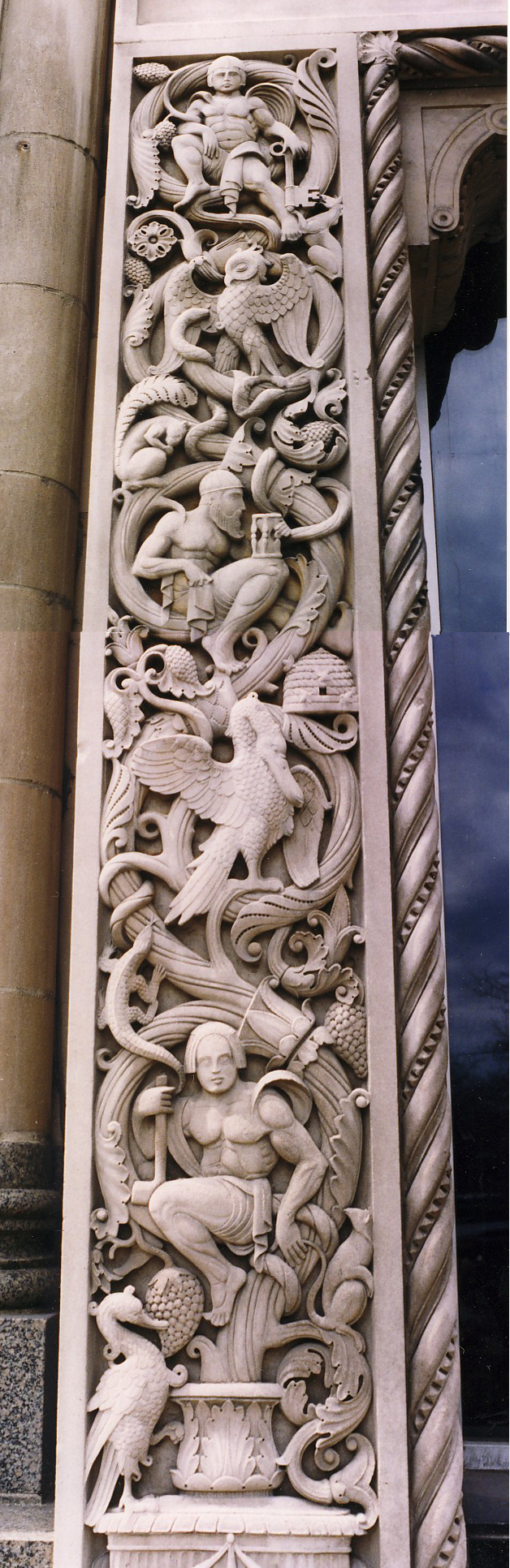
Bank, Detroit, Michigan

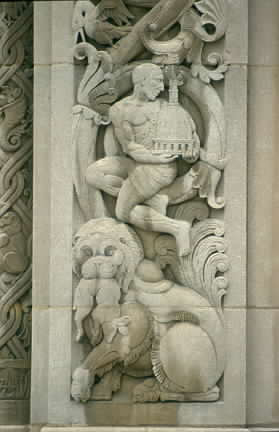
Bank of Lansing in Lansing, Michigan.

- Harlan Hatcher Graduate Library, Albert Kahn architect, University of Michigan, Ann Arbor, MI, 1920
- Bowery Savings Bank Building, York and Sawyer architects, New York, NY, 1922
- Wisconsin Hardware Ltd. Mutual Liability Insurance Company (headquarters), Stevens Point, WI, 1922
- General Motors Building, Albert Kahn architect, Detroit, MI, 1922
- Angell Hall, Albert Kahn architect, University of Michigan, Ann Arbor, MI, 1924
- Detroit Free Press Building, Albert Kan architect, Detroit, MI, 1925
- Brotherhood of Railway Trainmen Building, Cleveland, OH
- New York Telephone Building, Ralph Thomas Walker architect, New York, 1927
- Fisher Building, Albert Kahn architect, Detroit, MI, 1929
- DAR Constitution Hall, John Russell Pope, architect, Washington, D.C., 1930
- Bank of Lansing Building, Kenneth Black architect, Lansing, MI, 1931
- Department of Commerce, Louis Ayres, architect, Washington, D.C., 1934
- American Institute of Pharmacy, John Russell Pope architect, Washington, D.C., 1934
- National Archives, John Russell Pope architect, Washington, D.C., 1935
- Rundel Memorial Library, Rochester, NY, Gordon & Kaelber architects, Rochester, NY, 1936
- bronze doors at Bank of Canada, Marani, Morris & Allen, architects, Ottawa, ON
- bronze doors at the Iranian Embassy, Washington D.C., 1960

== Bank of Lansing ==
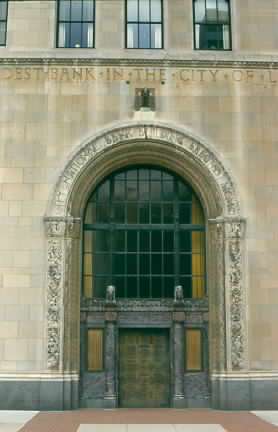
The Bank of Lansing

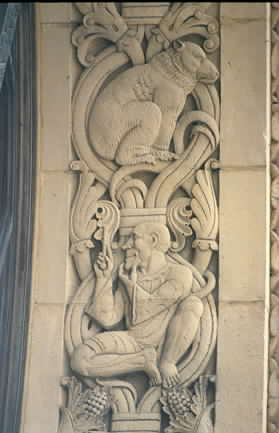
The door surround

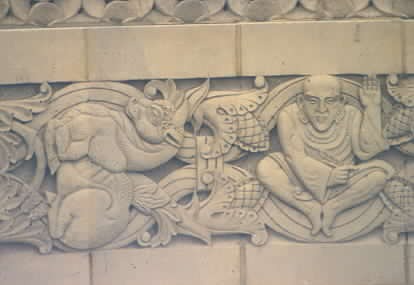
The top of the entrance arch
