= Saint Mark's and Saint John's Episcopal Church =

Historic church in New York, United States

- U.S. National Register of Historic Places
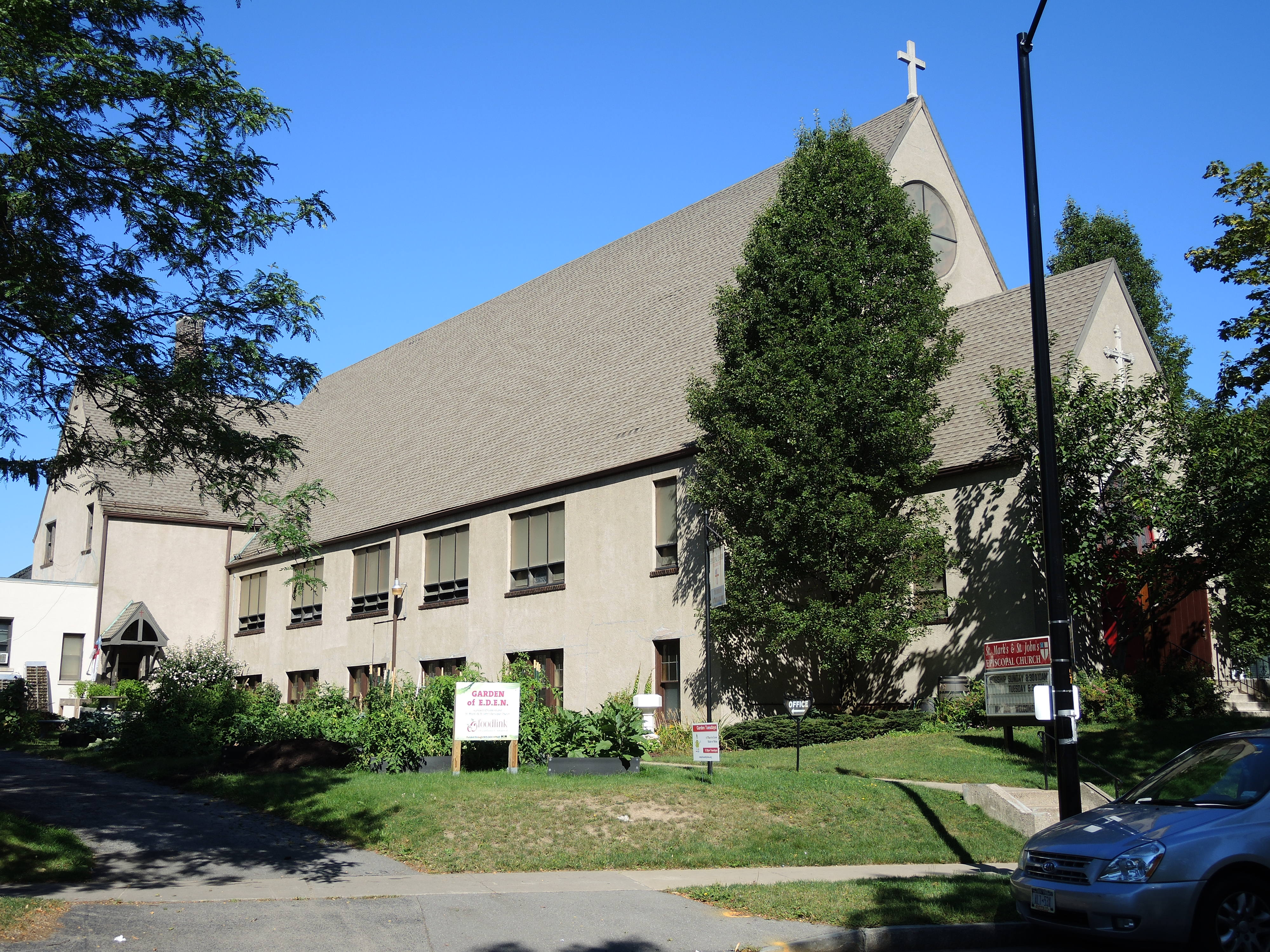

- Location within New York Location within the United States
- Location: 1245 Culver Rd., Rochester, New York
- Coordinates: 43°10′5″N 77°33′45″W
- Area: 0.5 acres (0.20 ha)
- Built: 1927
- Architect: Gordon and Kaelber
- Architectural style: Late Gothic Revival, Bungalow/Craftsman
- NRHP reference No.: 04001438
- Added to NRHP: December 16, 2004

Saint Mark's and Saint John's Episcopal Church is a historic Episcopal church located at Rochester in Monroe County, New York. Completed in 1928, it is architecturally significant as an intact representative example of simple Gothic inspired Arts and Crafts design applied to a neighborhood church edifice.

It was designed by architects Gordon and Kaelber.

It was listed on the National Register of Historic Places in 2004.
