= German United Evangelical Church Complex =

Historic church in New York, United States

- U.S. National Register of Historic Places
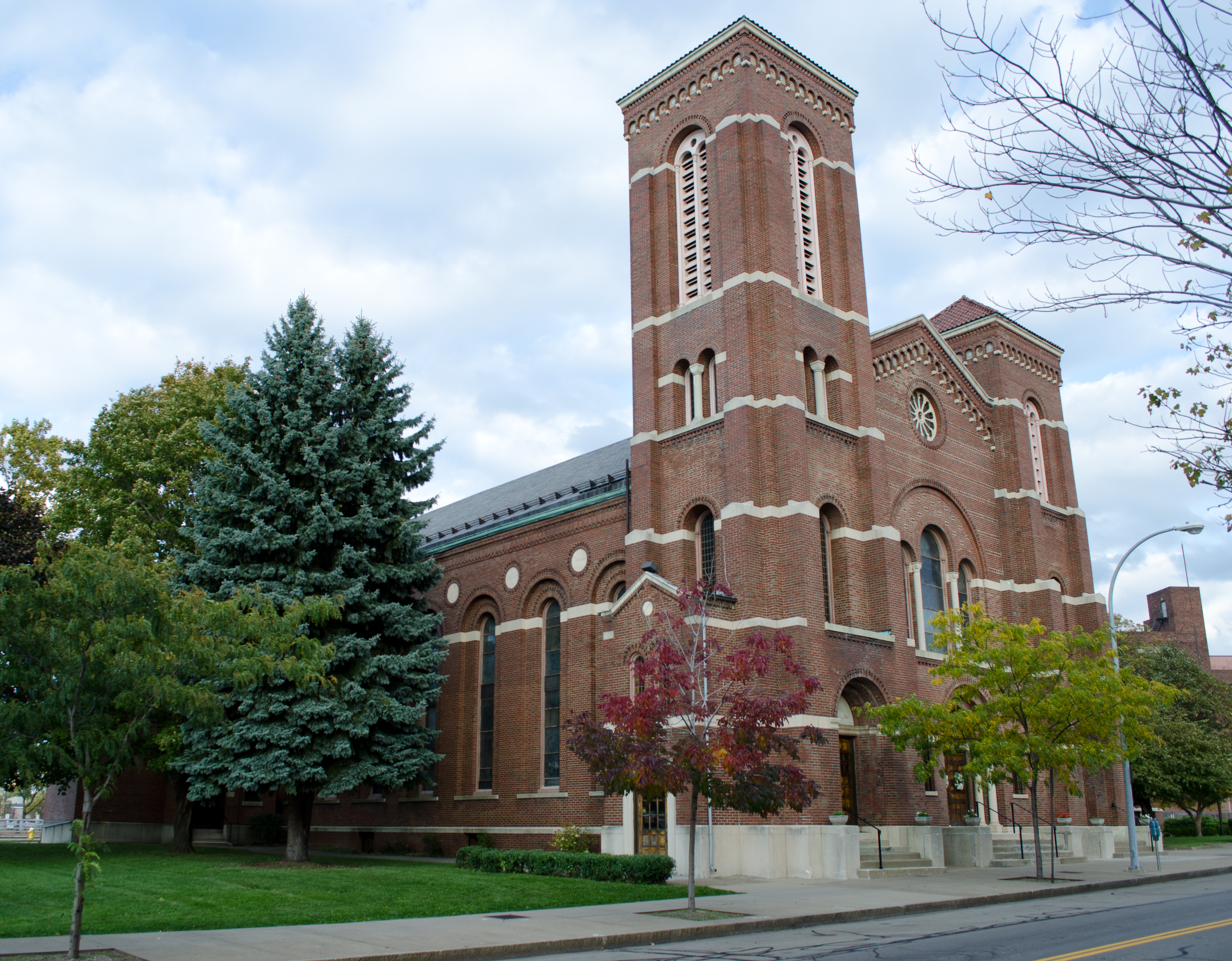
- Salem Church, October 2012

- Location within New York Location within the United States
- Location: 60-90 Bittner St., Rochester, New York
- Coordinates: 43°9′38″N 77°36′34″W
- Area: 1 acre (0.40 ha)
- Built: 1874
- Architect: Coots, Charles; Gordon & Kaelber
- Architectural style: Late 19th and 20th Century Revivals, Late Romanesque Revival
- MPS: Inner Loop MRA
- NRHP reference No.: 92000151
- Added to NRHP: March 12, 1992

German United Evangelical Church Complex, also known as Salem Evangelical Church (1921), Salem Evangelical and Reformed Church (1943), and Salem United Church of Christ (1957), is a historic Evangelical and Reformed church complex located at Rochester in Monroe County, New York. The complex includes the original church structure (1874) with attached wing (1895) and the later parish house and church school (1923).

It was listed on the National Register of Historic Places in 1992.

== Gallery ==
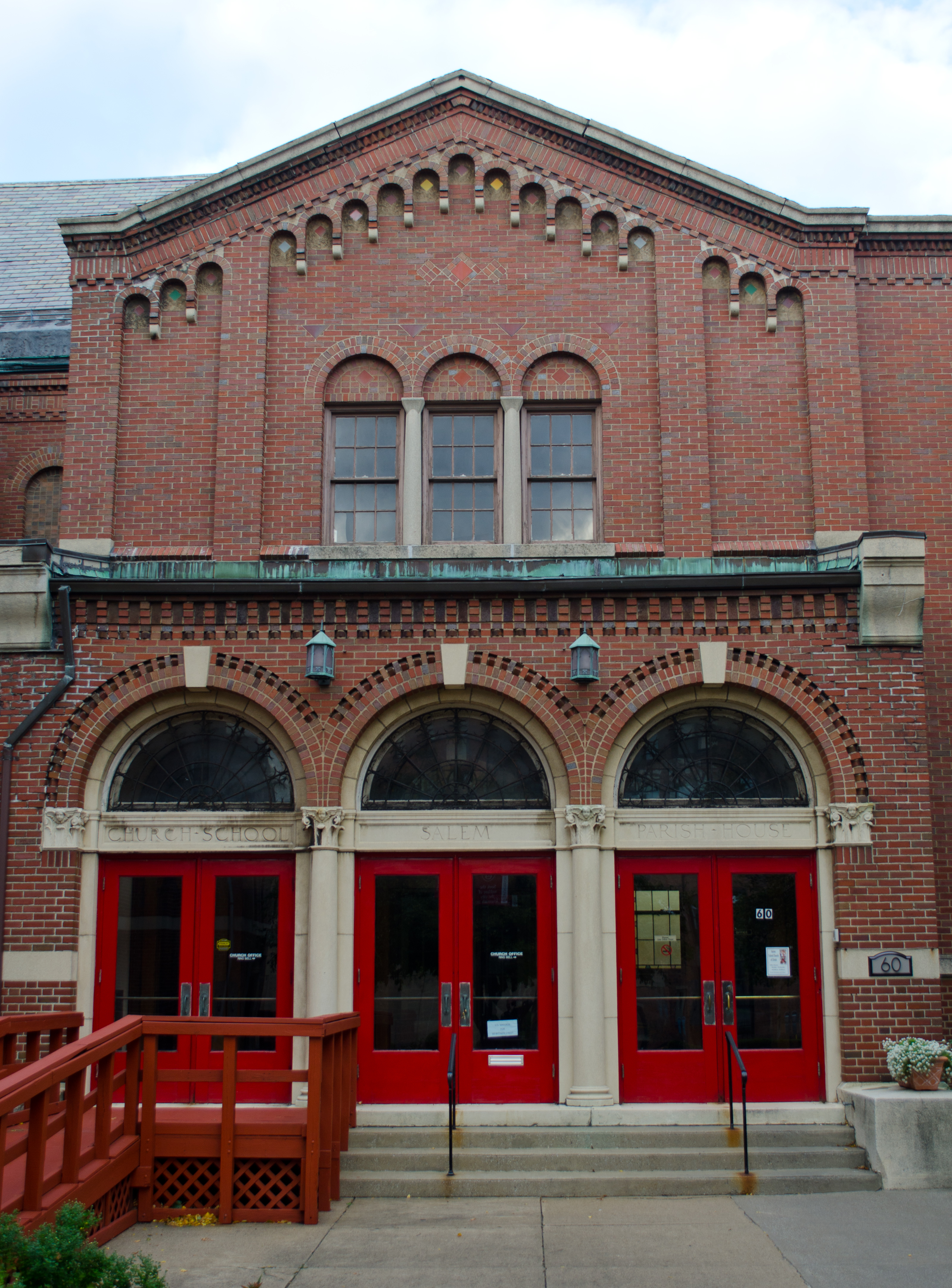
The parish house and church school building

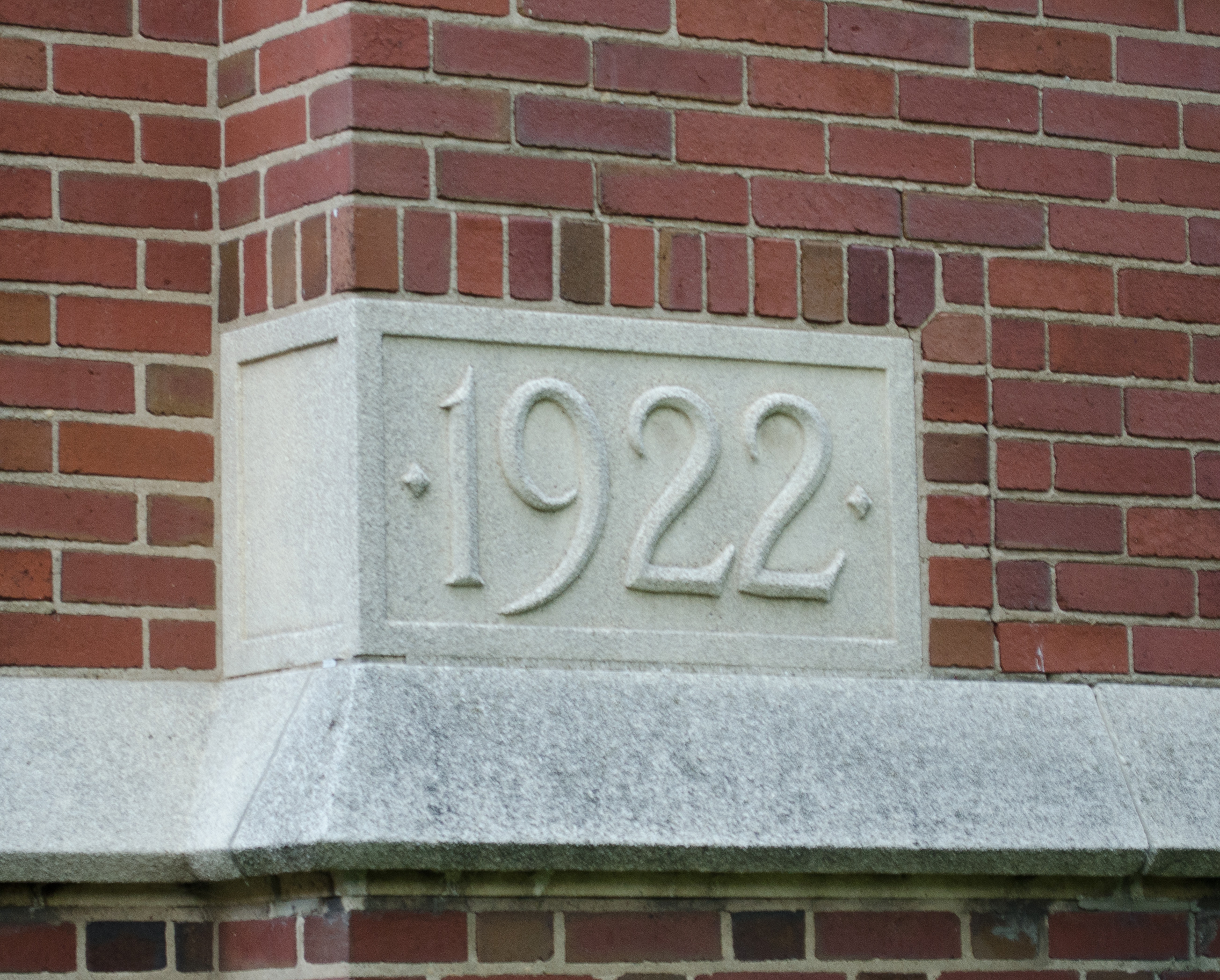
Cornerstone of the parish house

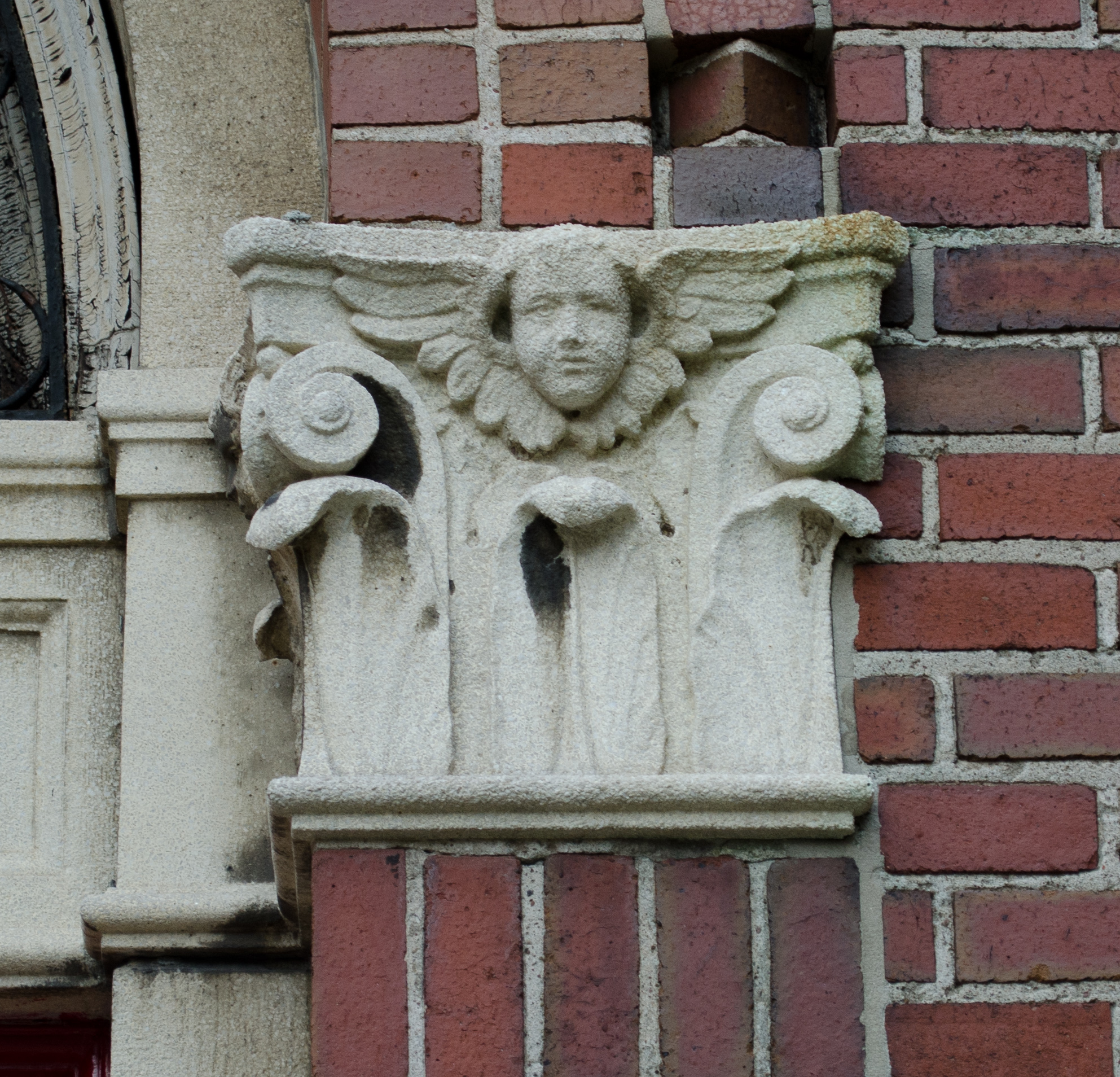
Cherub on the front of the parish house
