= Browncroft Historic District =

Historic district in New York, United States

- U.S. National Register of Historic Places
- U.S. Historic district
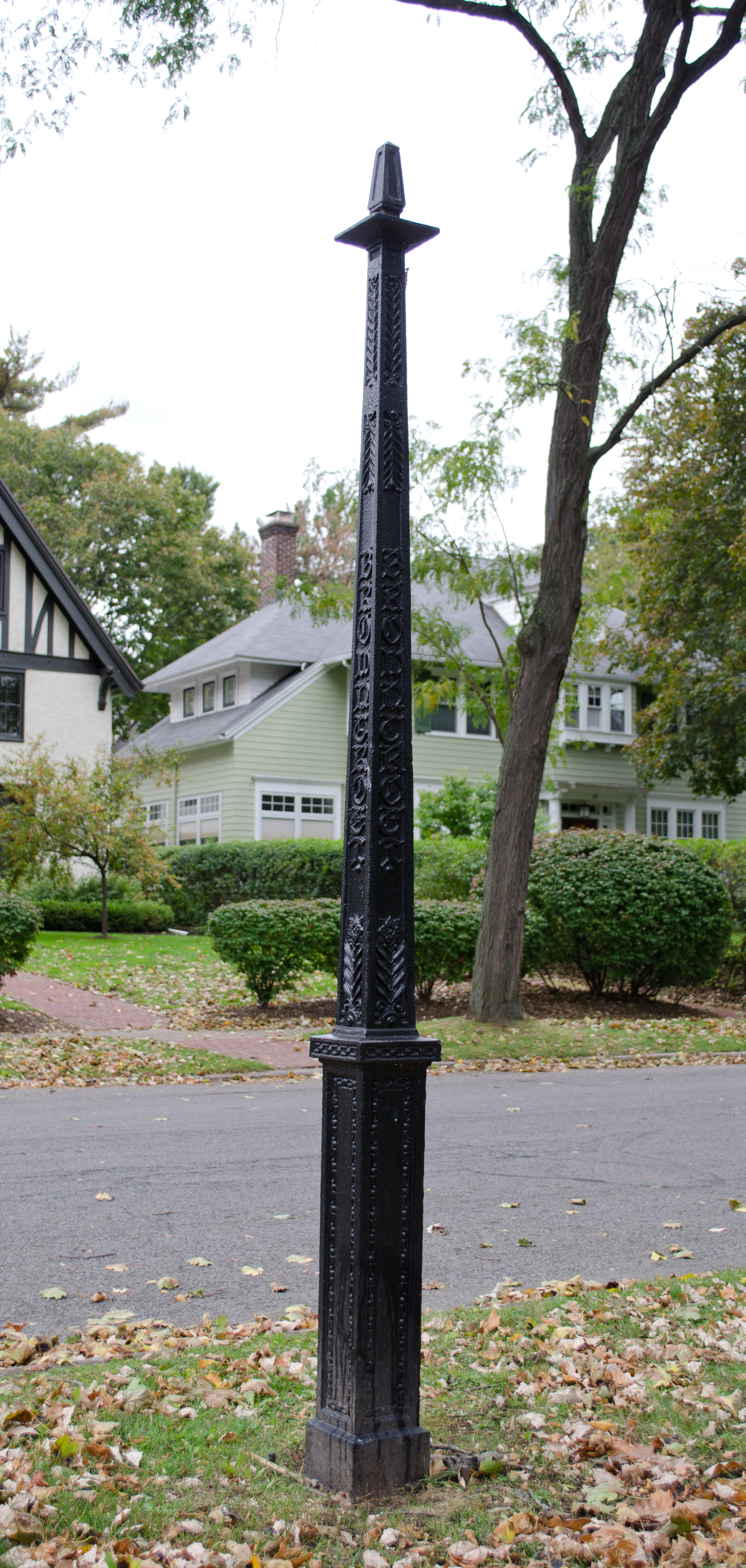
- One of the historic street signposts at the corner of Ramsey Park and Corwin Road

- Location within New York Location within the United States
- Location: Roughly bounded by Browncroft Blvd., Newcastle, Blossom, and Winton Rds., Rochester, New York
- Coordinates: 43°9′16″N 77°32′44″W
- Area: 116 acres (47 ha)
- Built: 1914 - 1933
- Architect: Browncroft Realty Corp. (landscape), Gordon & Kaelber, et al. (homes)
- Architectural style: Prairie Style, Tudor revival, Georgian revival, Colonial revival
- NRHP reference No.: 04000346
- Added to NRHP: April 20, 2004

The Browncroft Historic District is a national historic district located in the Browncroft neighborhood of Rochester, New York. The district contains 518 contributing buildings, two contributing sites, two contributing objects, and two contributing structures over 116 acres. It includes 417 residential properties constructed between 1914 and World War II.

The neighborhood's original developer, Charles J. Brown, former president of the National Nurserymen's Association, gave it its name. It was declared a National Historic District and added to the National Register of Historic Places in 2004. The district is "recognized for the architectural integrity of the homes, a landscape design that features uniform plantings of flowering shrubs and shade trees, and its role in the development of Rochester."

== Description ==
The historic district includes only certain designated properties located in a subsection of the neighborhood approximately circumscribed by Browncroft Boulevard on the North, Newcastle Road on the east, Blossom Road on the south, and Winton Road on the west.

Unofficial landmarks within the historic district include:

- Two of the development's original wrought iron street signposts (Located at the corner of Ramsey Park and Corwin Road (43.155960°N 77.548040°W) and at the corner of Windemere and Newcastle Roads (43.155360°N 77.541980°W)).
- The house at 273 Dorchester Road (43.154210°N 77.542730°W) which contains columns from the original nursery office before its demolition.
- The house at 540 North Winton Road (43.15577°N 77.54910°W), the original farmhouse of Steven M. Corwin, which later served as Brown's home.

== Gallery ==
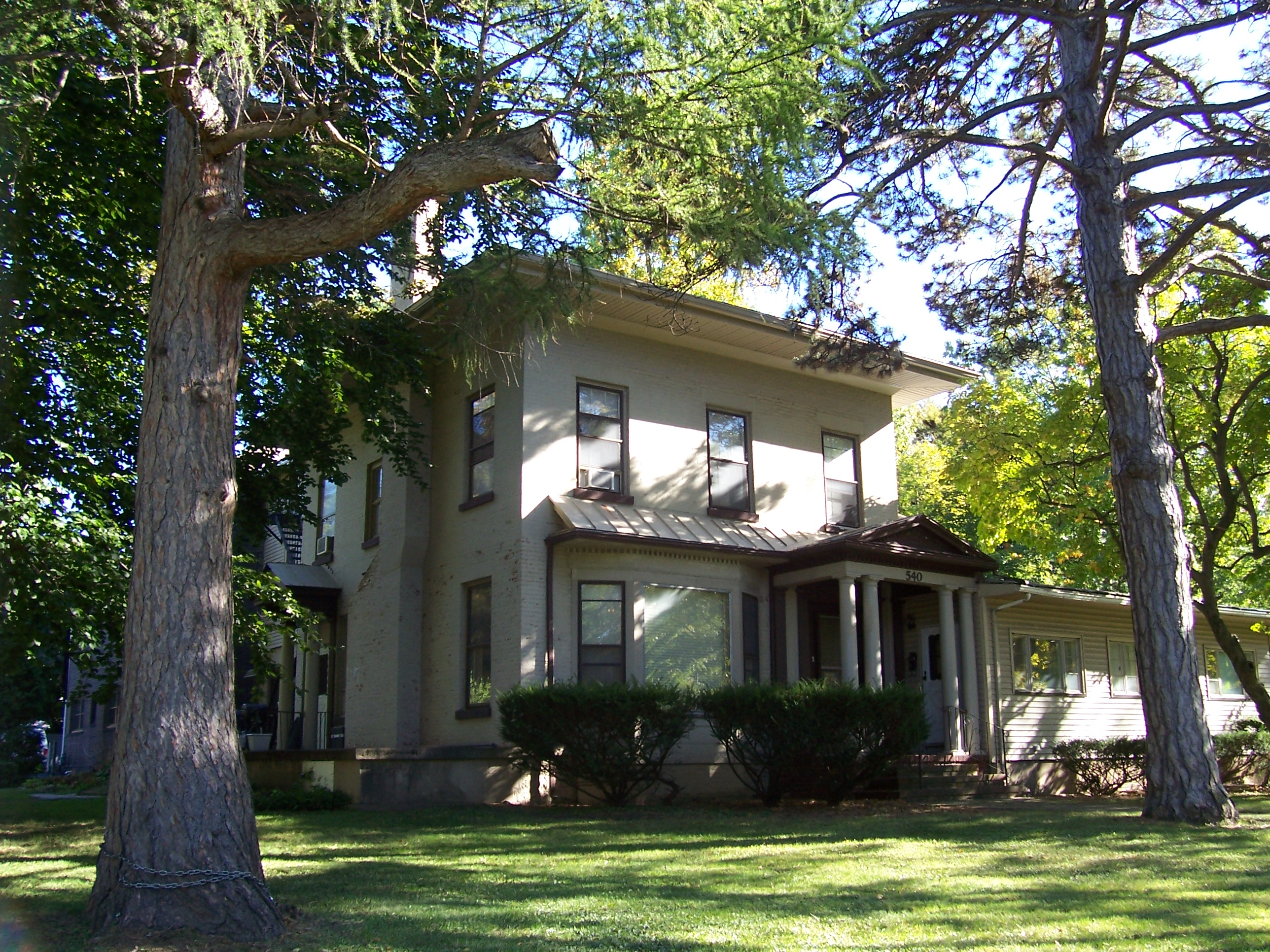
The Steven M. Corwin Home at 540 North Winton Road

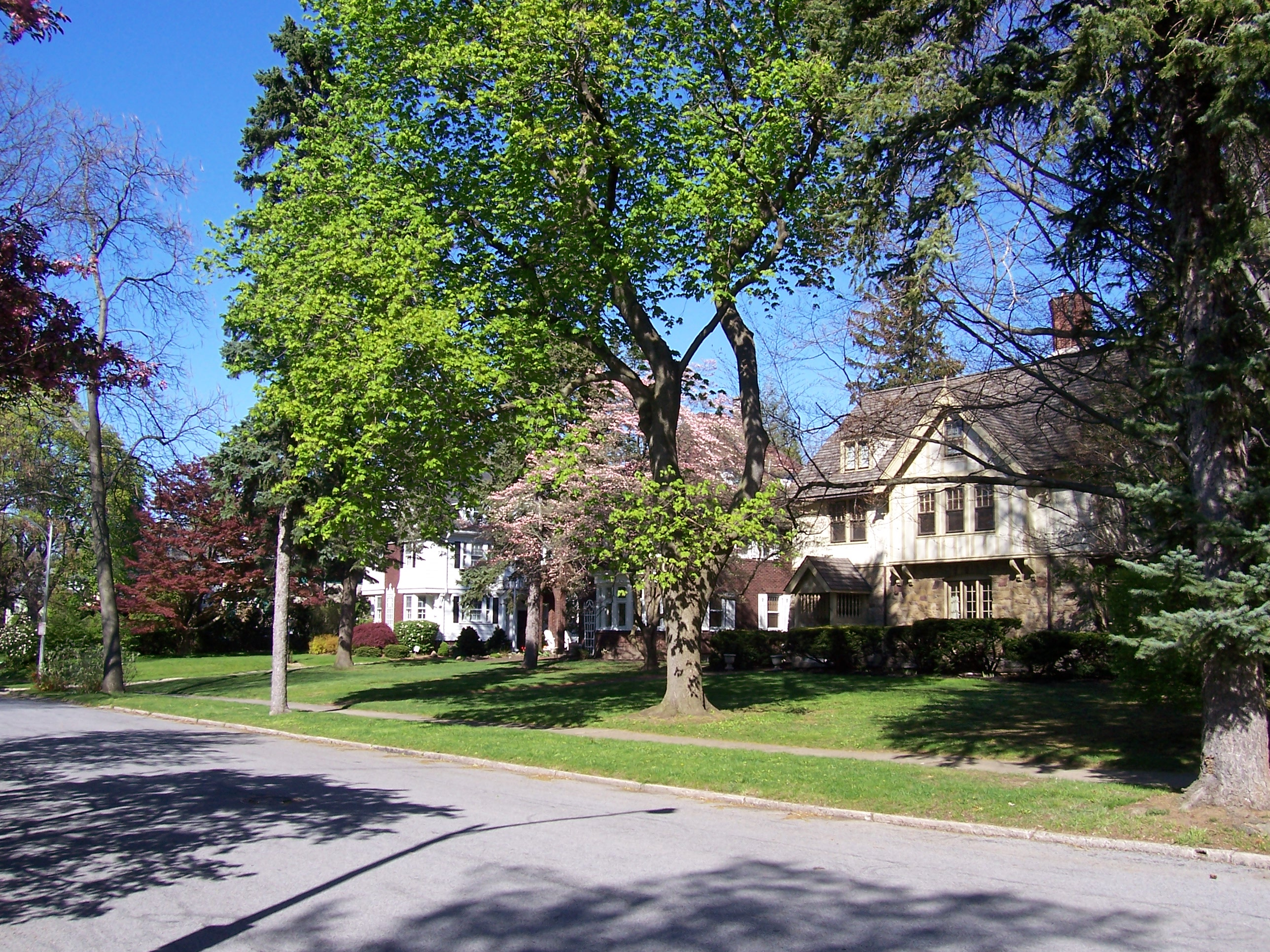
10, 22 and 30 Ramsey Park

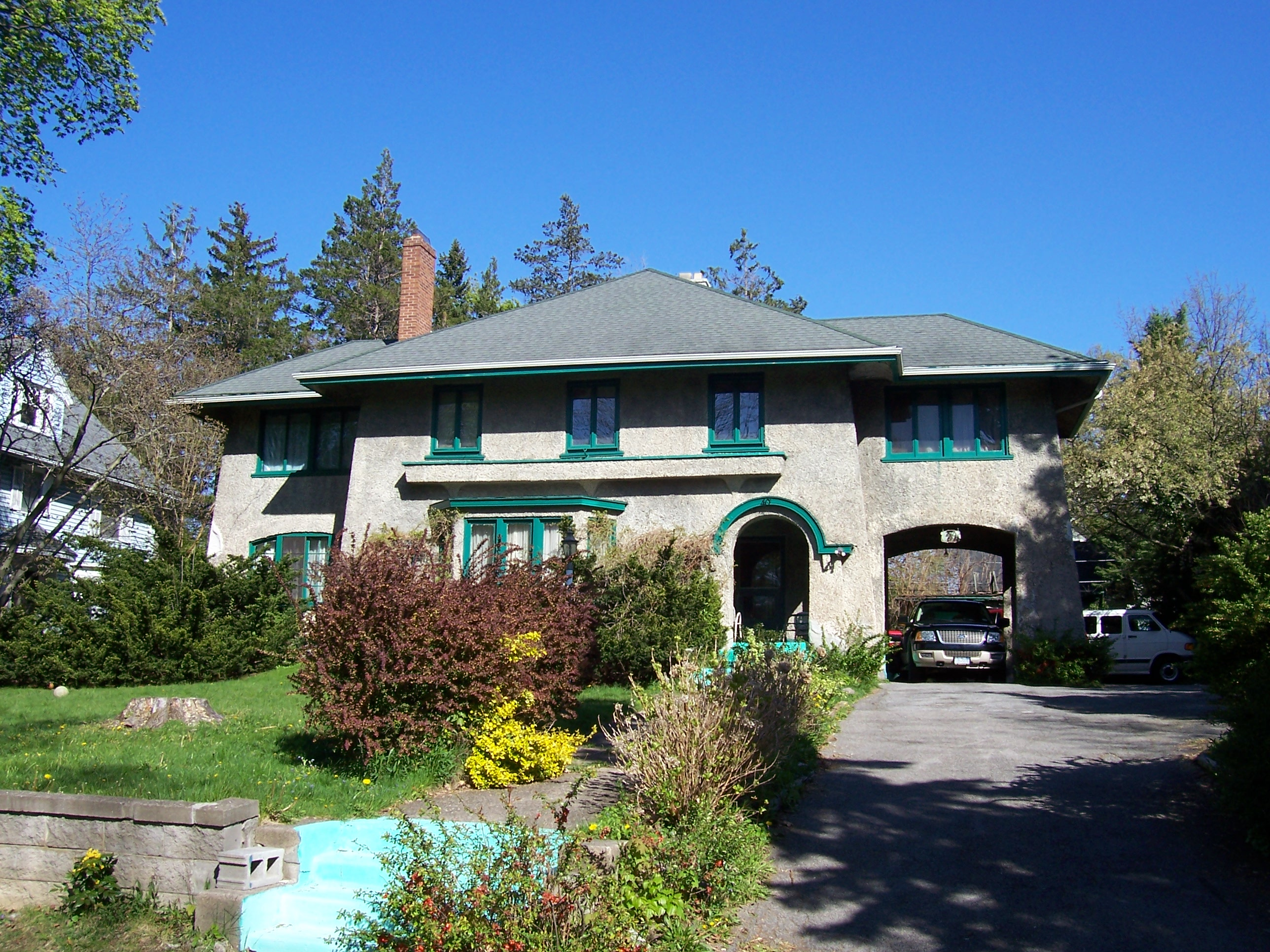
40 Ramsey Park

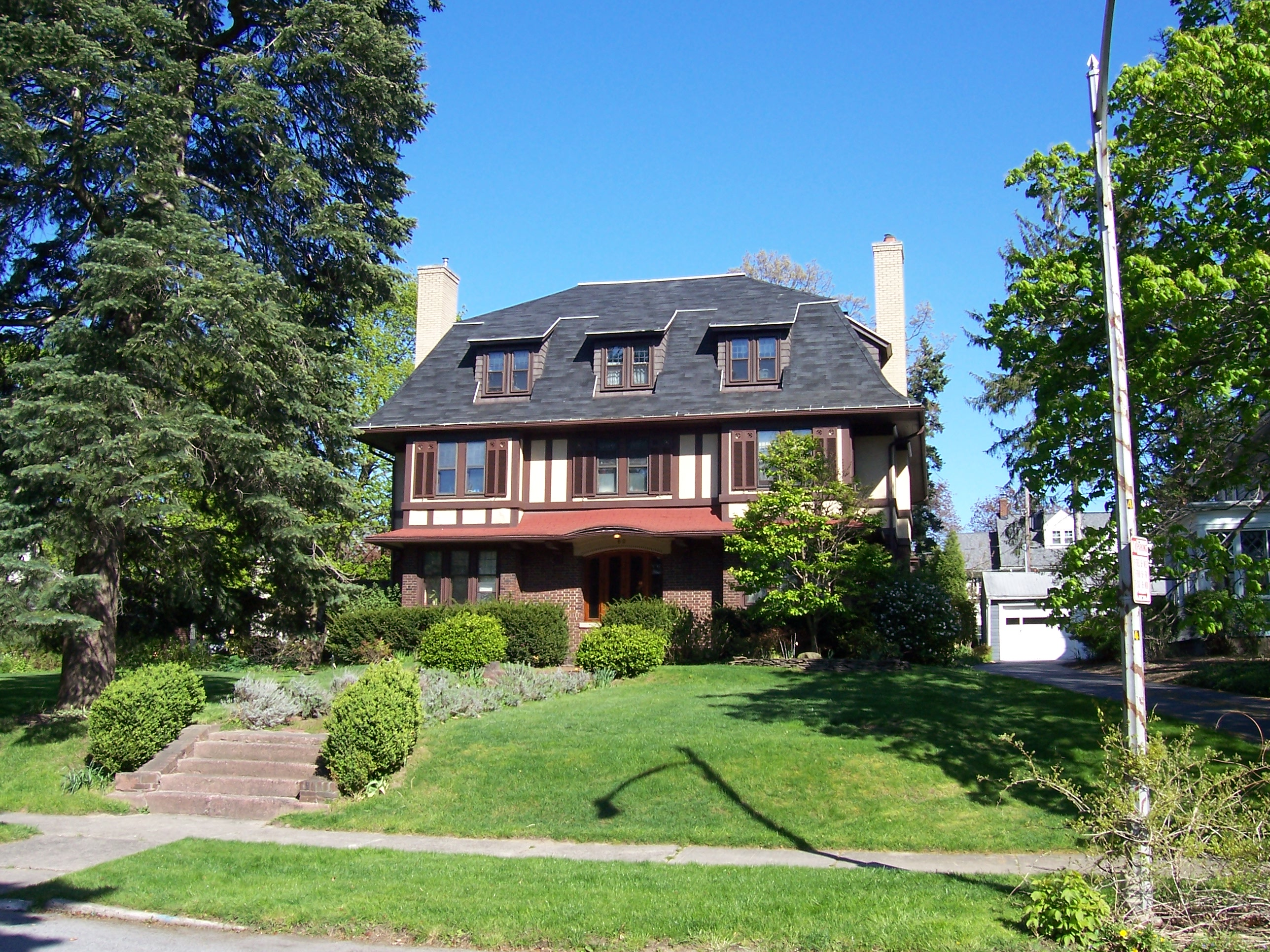
60 Ramsey Park

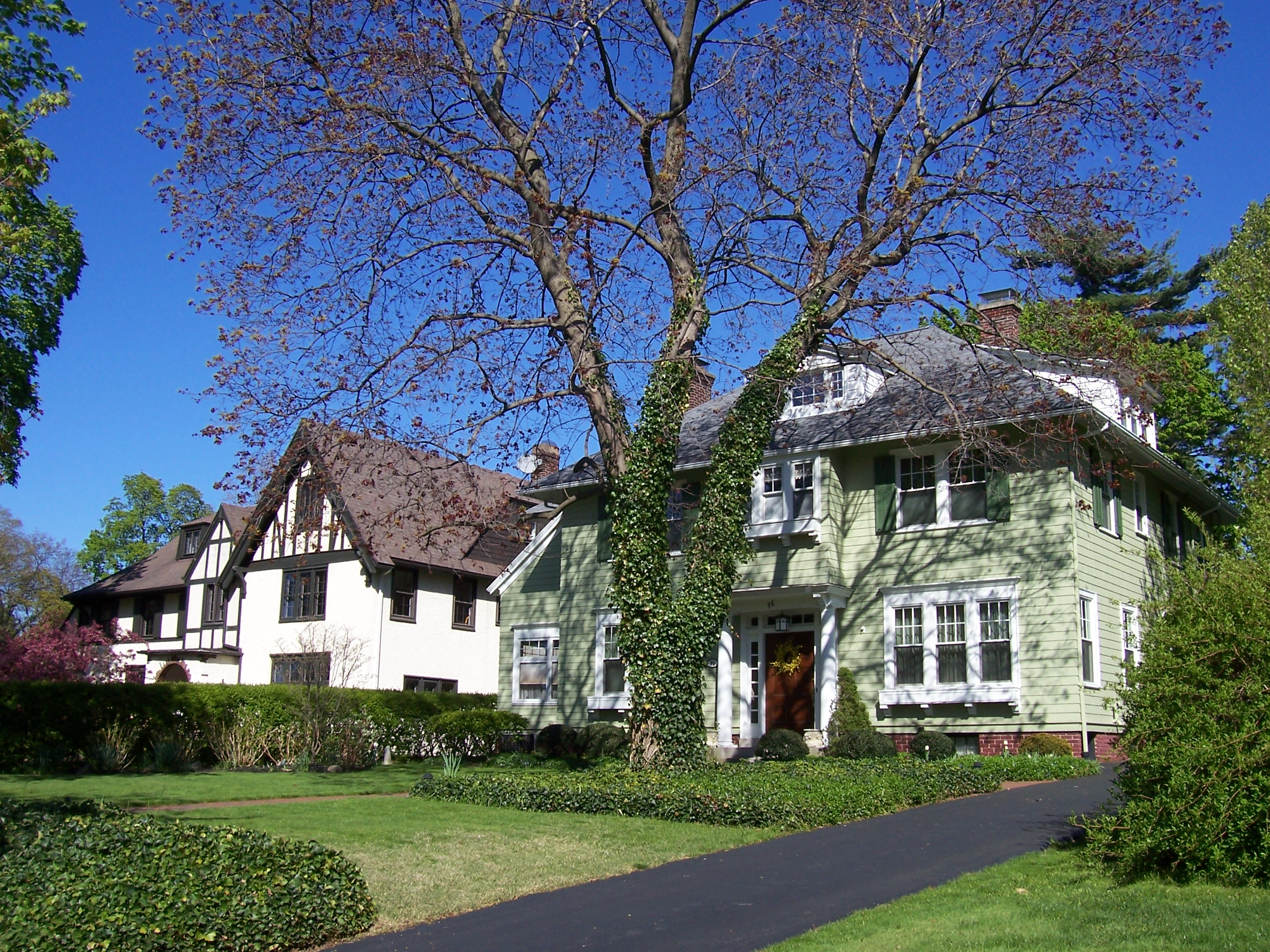
76-80 Ramsey Park
