= Immaculate Conception Church (Rochester, New York) =

Historic church in New York, United States

- Immaculate Conception Roman Catholic Church Complex
- U.S. National Register of Historic Places
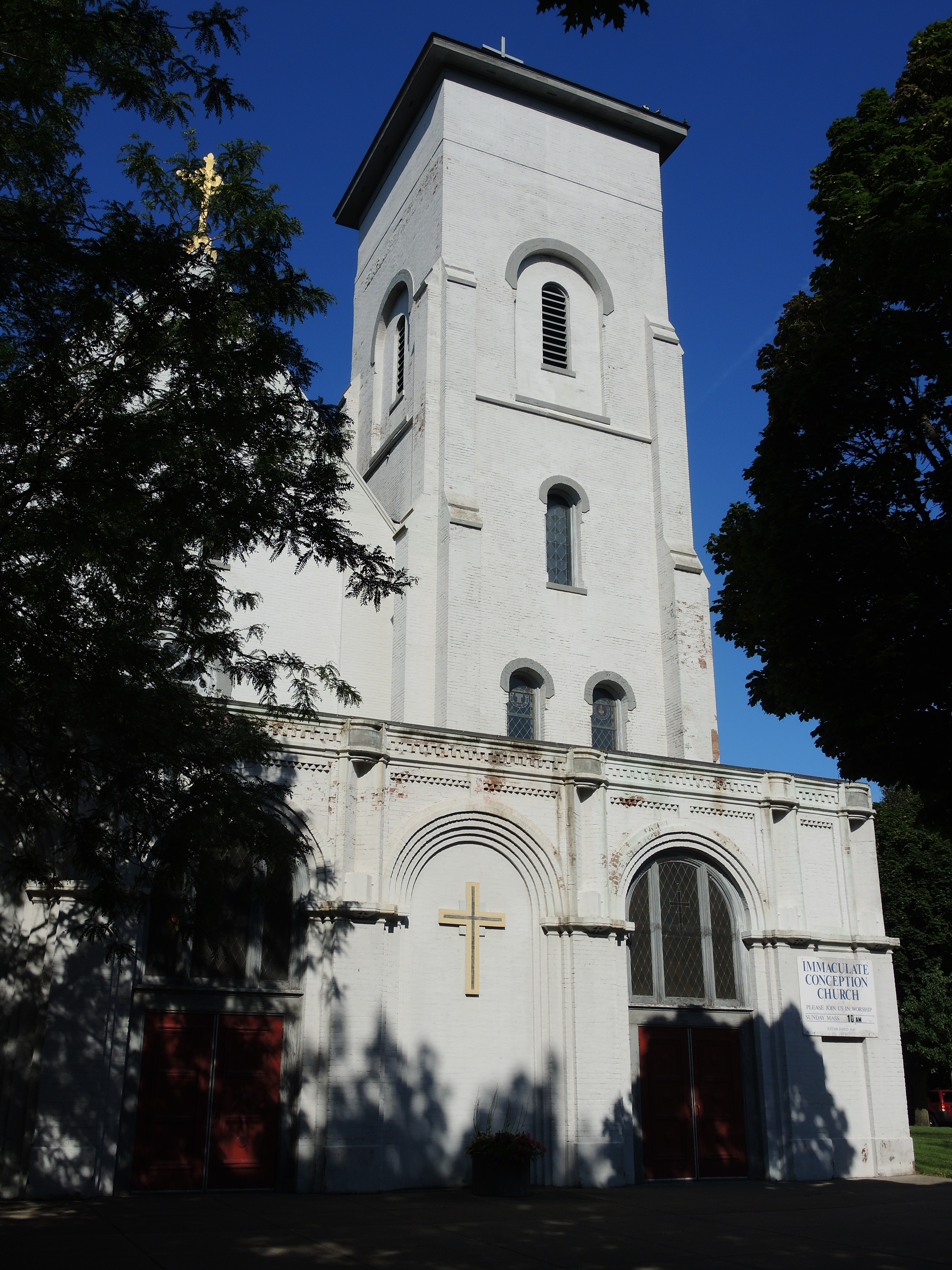
- Entrance and steeple

- Location within New York Location within the United States
- Location: 445 Frederick Douglass St. and 187 and 205 Edinburgh St., Rochester, New York
- Coordinates: 43°8′47″N 77°37′4″W
- Area: 2.3 acres (0.93 ha)
- Architect: Frank Frey; Gordon & Madden
- Architectural style: Second Empire, Italianate, Romanesque
- NRHP reference No.: 92000381
- Added to NRHP: March 31, 1992

Immaculate Conception Catholic Church is a historic Catholic church located in Rochester, New York. The larger complex consists of five buildings: the church (1864), former rectory (1871), the former parochial school (1926), the current rectory (ca. 1900), and garage (ca. 1926).

The church is known as an African-American Catholic parish and the complex was listed on the National Register of Historic Places in 2002.

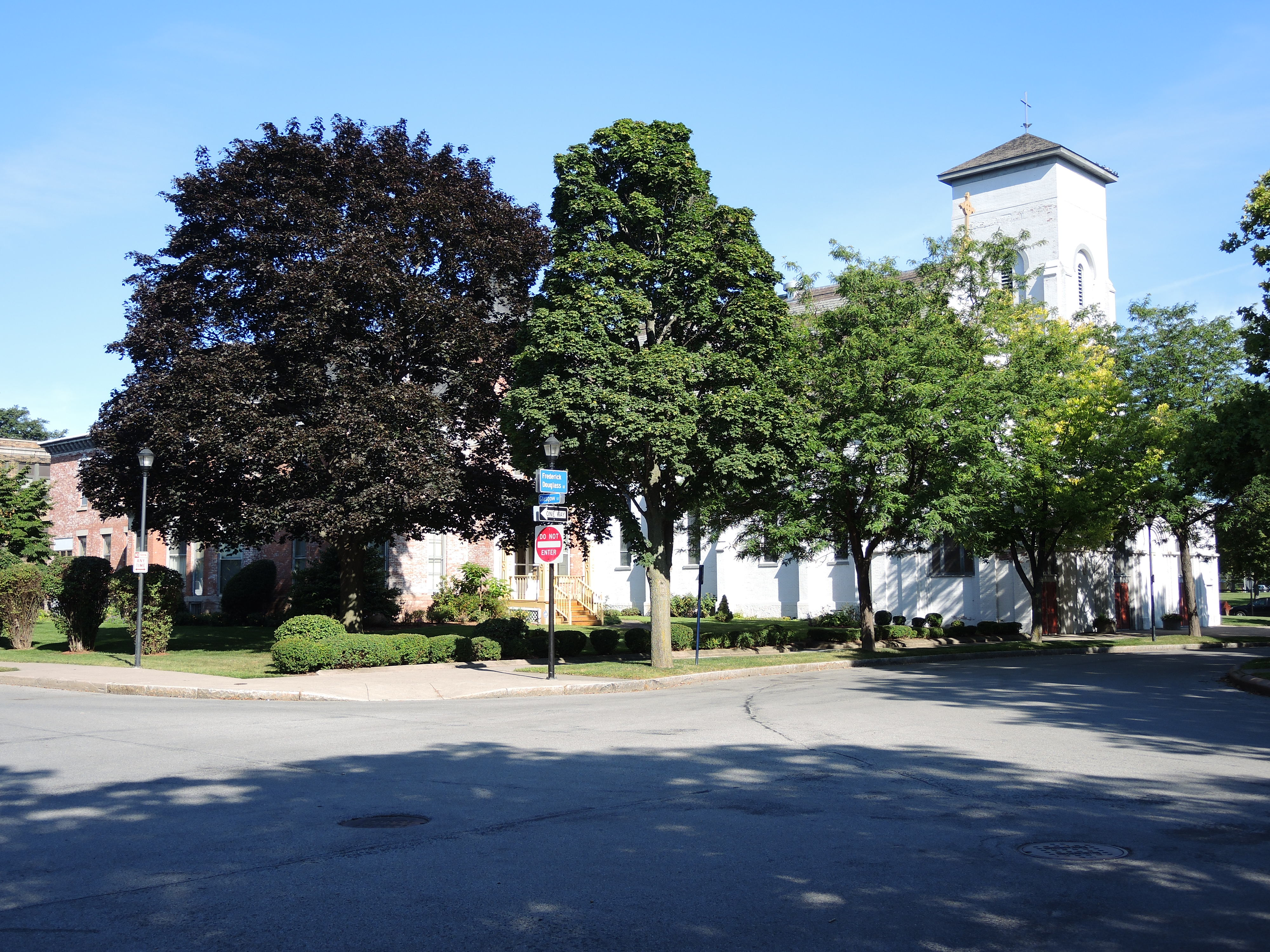
Complex

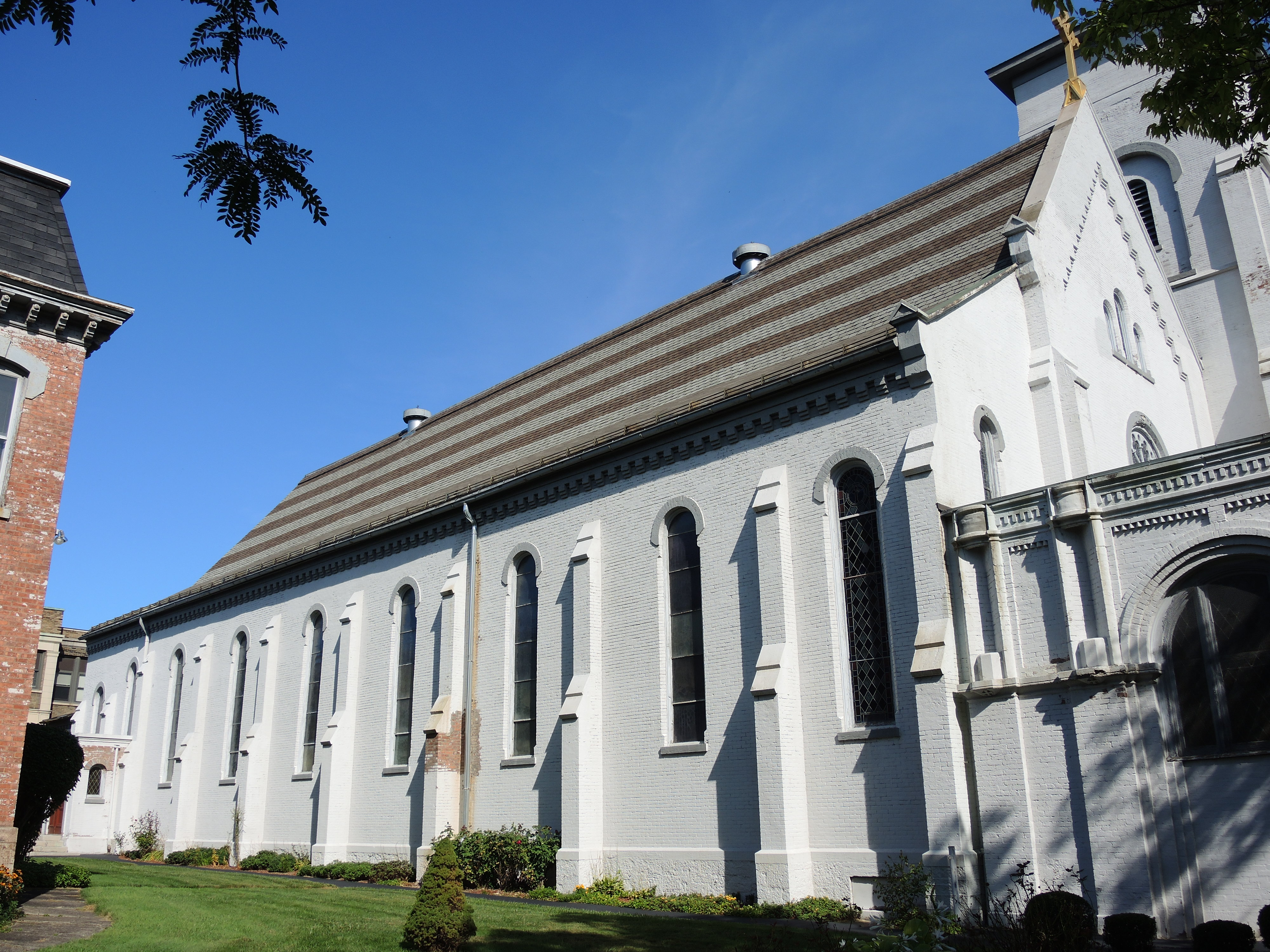
South side

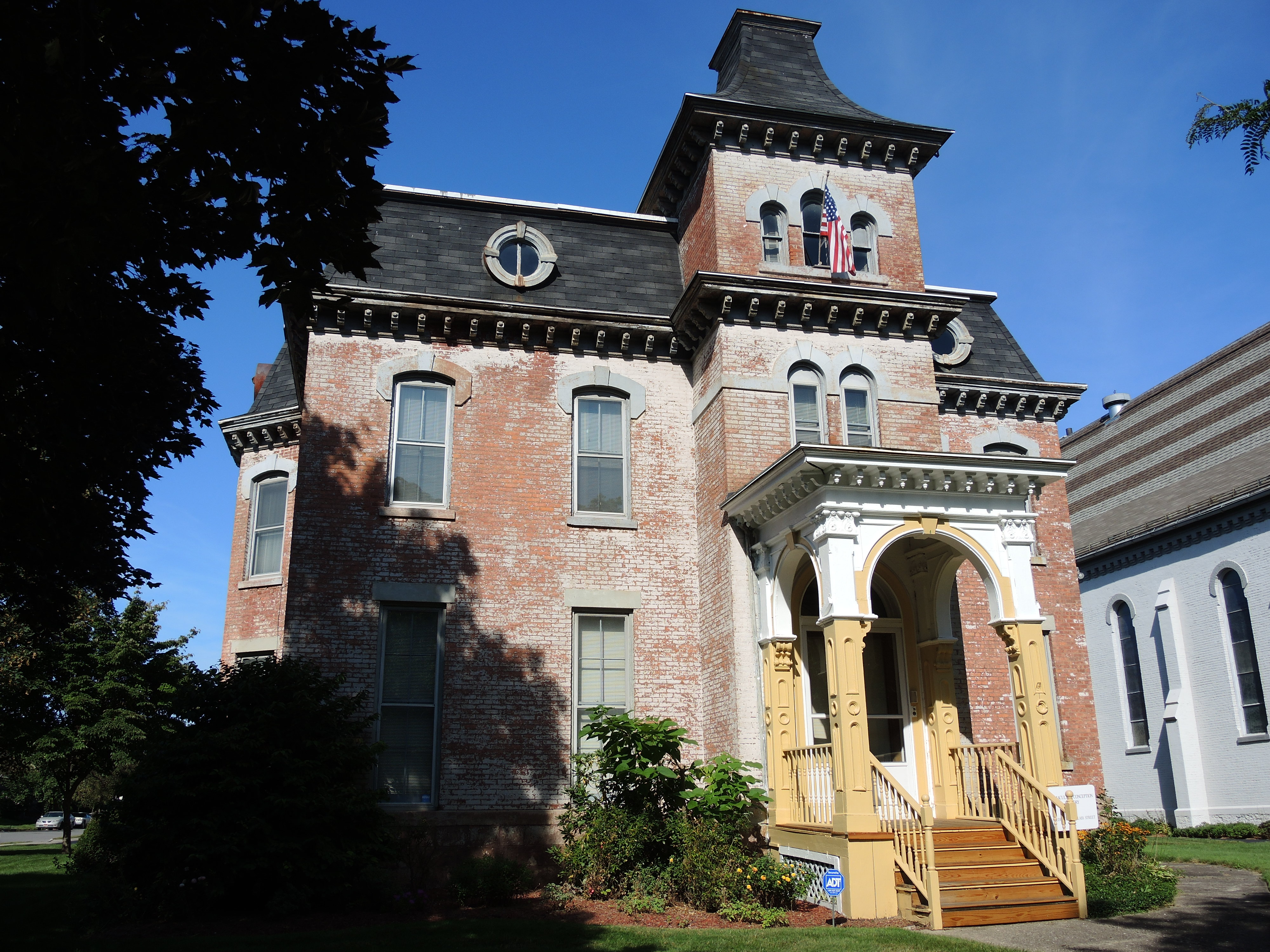
Old rectory, front view

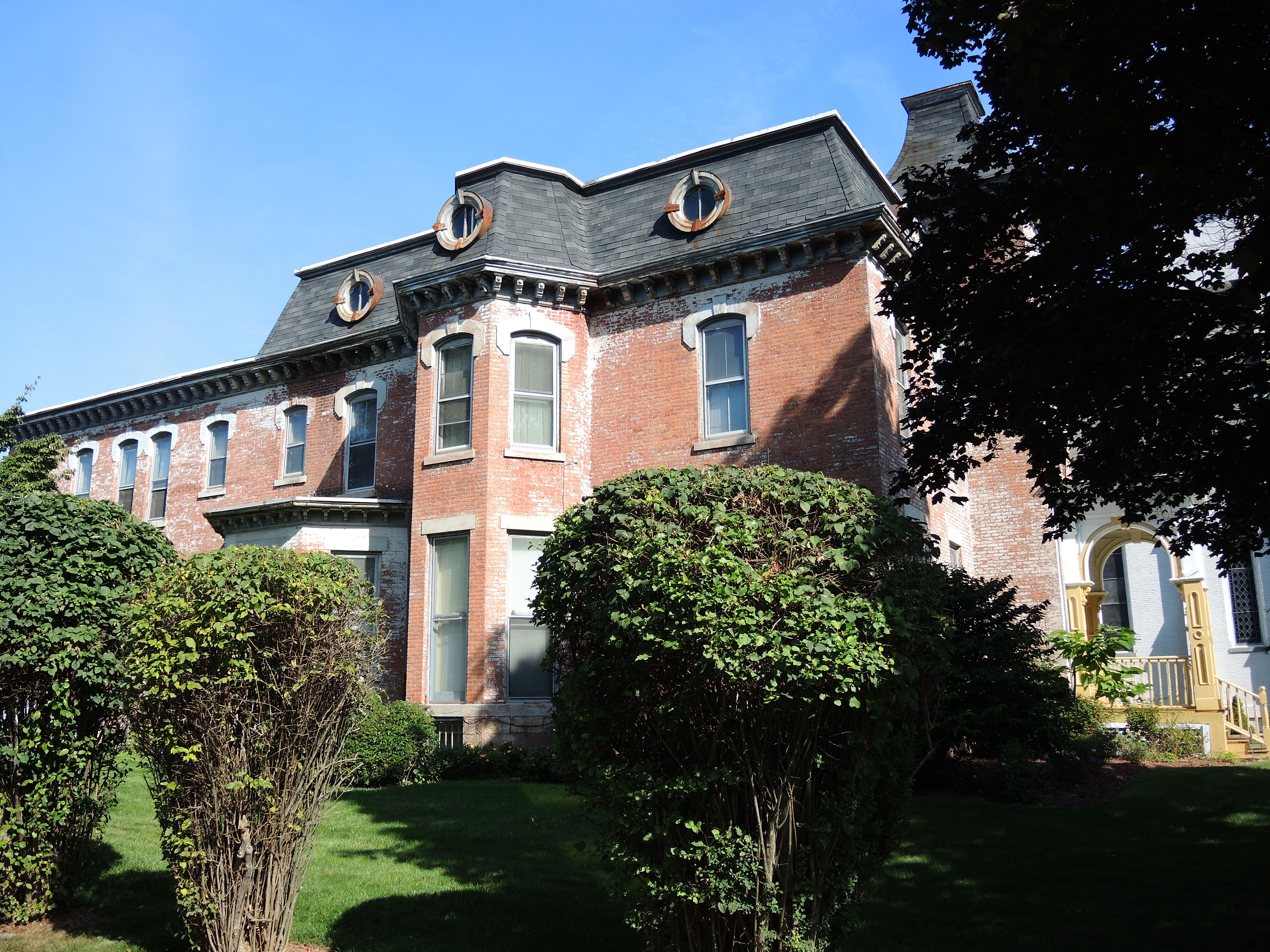
Old rectory, side view

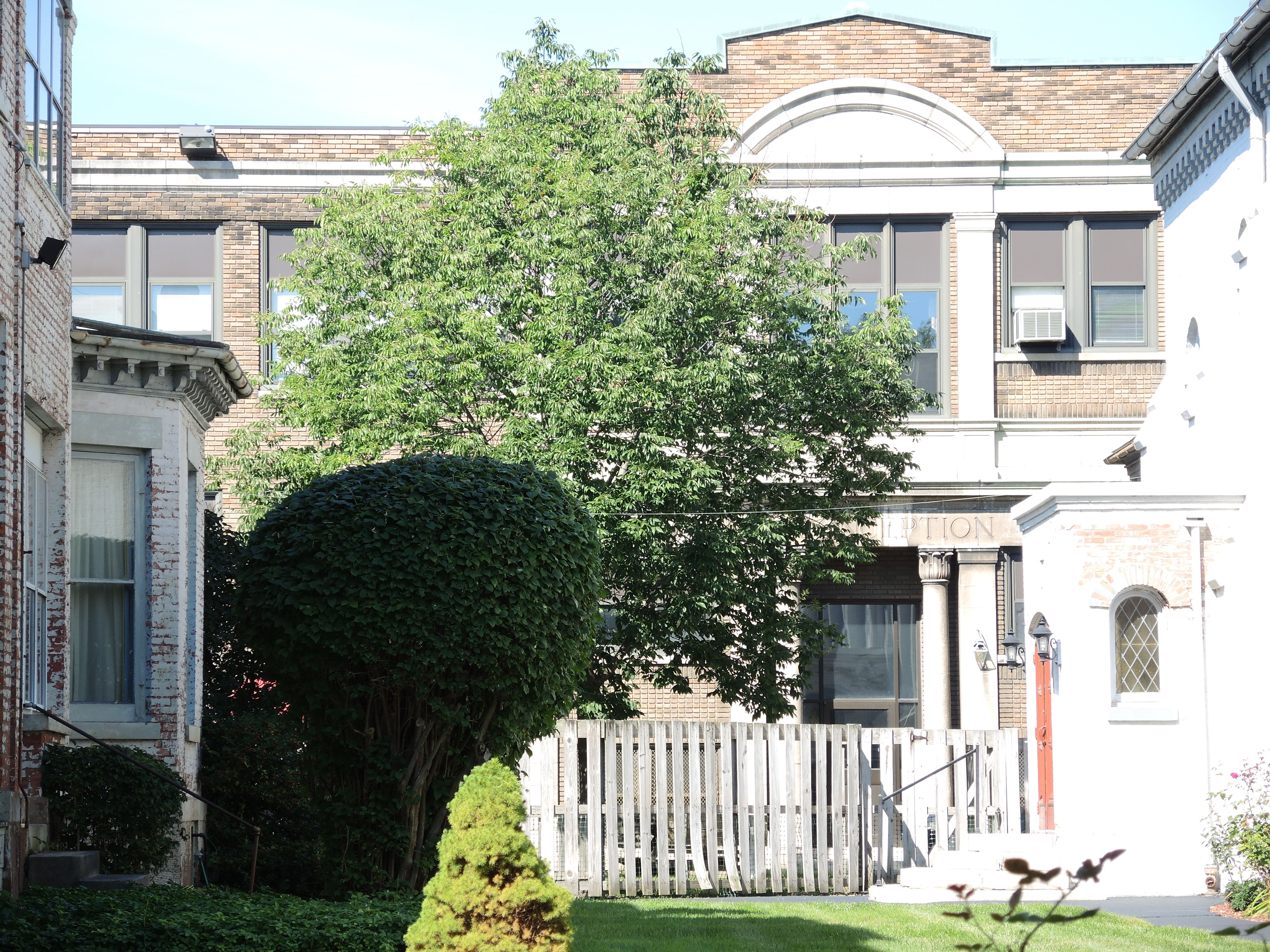
Parochial school, east view

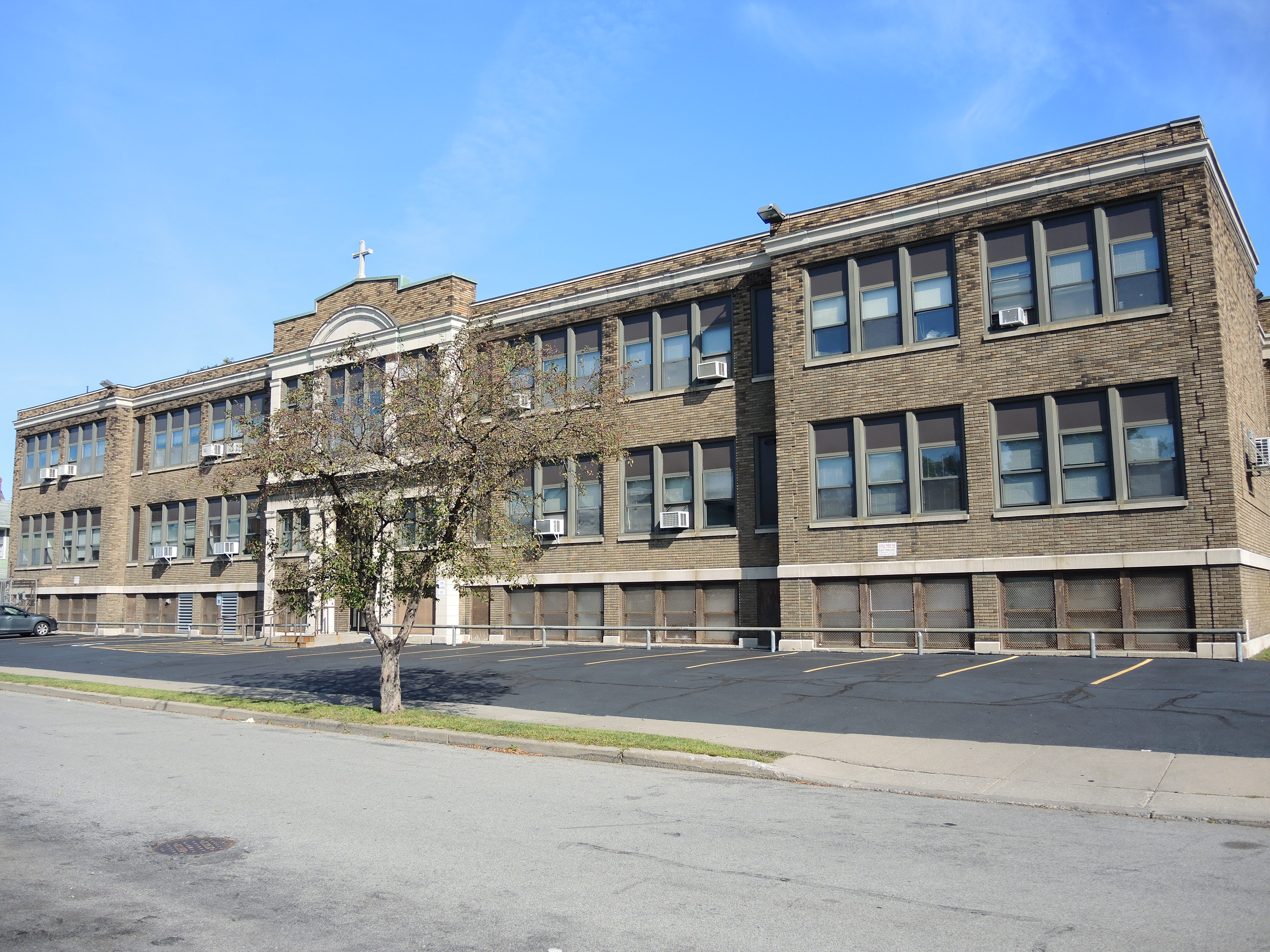
Parochial school, south view

== Notable past students ==
- Mary E. Clarke, director of the Women's Army Corps
