= Mary E. Clarke =

United States Army general

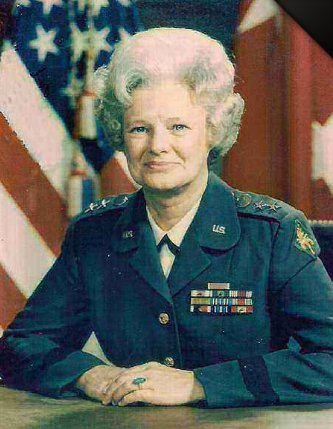
- Clarke during the late-1970s
- Born: December 3, 1924; Rochester, New York, US
- Died: June 10, 2011 (aged 86); San Antonio, Texas, US
- Burial place: Ft Sam Houston National Cemetery
- Military career
- Allegiance: United States
- Branch: United States Army
- Service years: 1945–1981
- Rank: Major General
- Nickname: "Betty"
- Commands: Women's Army Corps
- Conflicts: World War II
- Awards: Legion of Merit; Meritorious Service Medal (2); Army Commendation Medal (2)
- Other work: Defense Advisory Committee

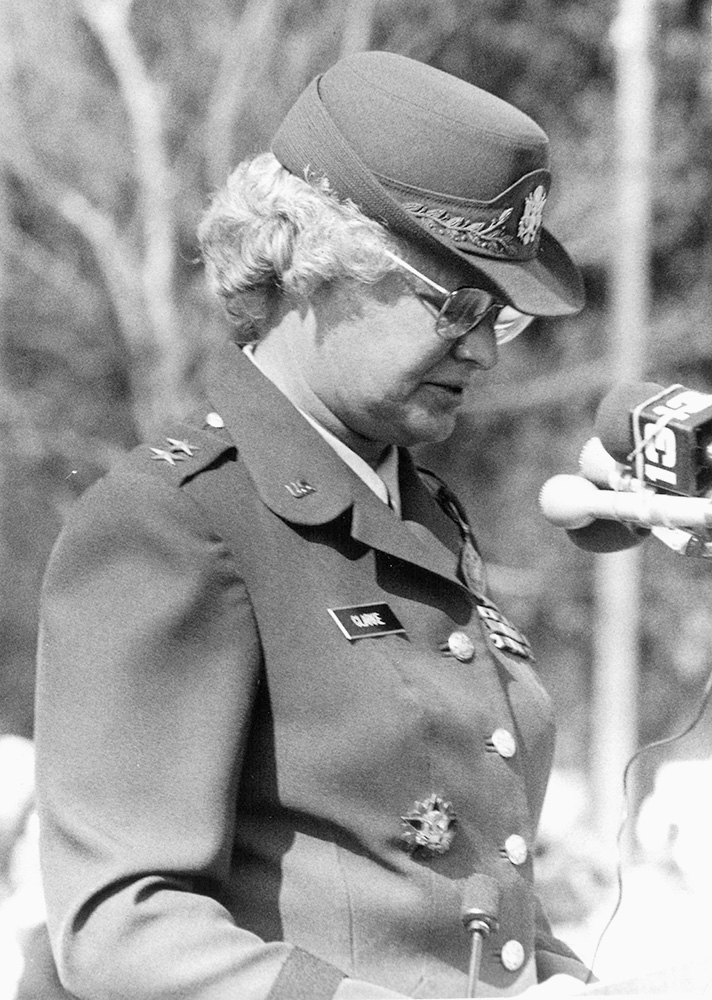
General Clarke speaks at her retirement ceremony, WAC Center, Fort McClellan.

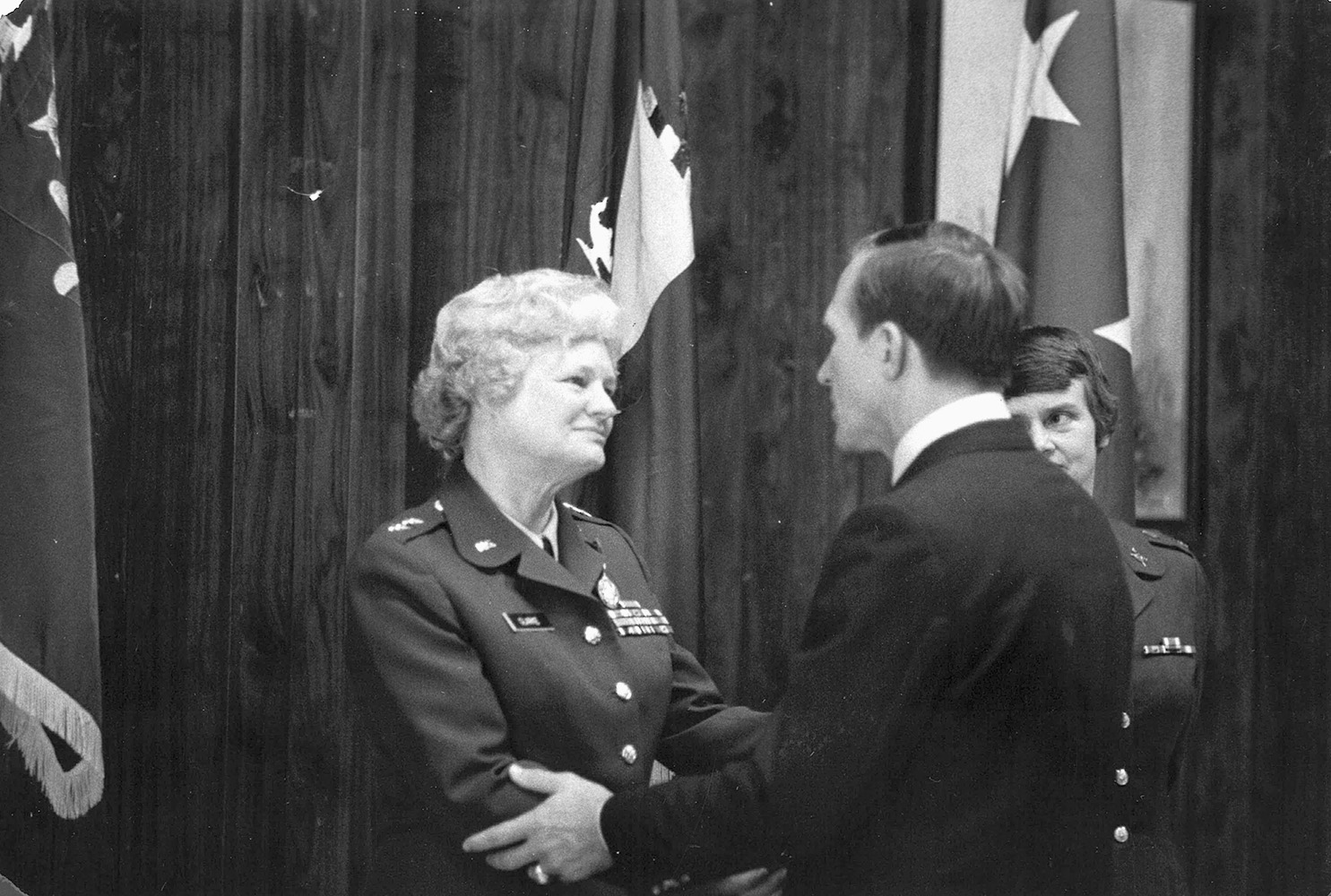
Assistant Secretary of the Army (Manpower and Reserve Affairs) Harry N. Walters at retirement ceremonies for General Clarke, 31 October 1981.

Mary Elizabeth Clarke (December 3, 1924 – June 10, 2011) was a United States Army officer who was the department head of the Women's Army Corps. She was promoted to the rank of major general in the United States Army and was the first woman to attain this rank. She served in the United States Army for thirty six years, the longest ever served for a woman in the United States Army. In 1978 Norwich University awarded her an honorary doctorate in military science. She retired in 1981 and was on the Women in the Services Defense Advisory Committee.

== Early life and schooling ==
Clarke was born on December 3, 1924, in Rochester, New York. She attended the Rochester Immaculate Conception School and the Rochester West High School. She was given the nickname of Betty when in her twenties.An alternative is that this started much earlier as she is listed as Betty in both the 1930 and 1940 US Census.

== Career ==
Clarke's first job was as a secretary and later as a defense worker. When she was twenty one years old she enlisted at Fort Des Moines, Iowa, in the Women's Army Corps (WAC) in August 1945, just before World War II ended. She thought she was only going to serve until the end of the war. She was commissioned into the WAC Officer Candidate Course and a commander from an all-male regiment thought it was inconceivable she would even get through the basic training. Clarke made it through the initial training and decided to remain in the army. She served in the enlisted ranks for an additional four years. Clarke did her training at Fort Des Moines Provisional Army Officer Training School located in Iowa. Upon completion she was then assigned as a supply sergeant at Camp Stoneman, California. In 1948 she was given orders to go to Berlin, Germany. There she was with the Berlin Brigade in the middle of the Berlin Airlift crisis.

Clarke's next assignments were at the United States Army Chemical Center and Valley Forge General Hospital. Clarke then did recruitment duty for a year. She attended the WAC Officer Candidate School at Camp Lee and after the schooling in September 1949 she became a WAC commissioned officer as a second lieutenant. Then she went to Tokyo to become a commanding officer at a WAC unit and was there for two years before leaving to go to the United States. She held officer's positions in Texas, Alabama, Maryland, California and Washington, D.C. from 1958 through 1971.

Clarke was given duties at the Office of Equal Opportunity and Deputy Chief of Staff for Personnel in Washington, D.C. and did WAC consulting in preparation of historical books. She reached the rank of colonel in 1972 and became the commander of the United States WAC Center and School in Fort McClellan. Clarke became the department director of the WAC Advisory Office in 1974. In 1975 she became brigadier general and the leader of the WAC. She had special training at the United States Military Academy Preparatory School in 1976 to have women qualify to attend military academies, since it was then allowed for women to attend these academies which came about through a federal directive of President Gerald Ford.

Clarke was at the WAC from 1975 to 1978 as the last executive, as it was dissolved at the end of her administration. After this assignment she was given the rank of a two-star general and promoted to major general in November 1978. She then immediately became commander of the United States Army Military Police School and Training Center. During her tenure, in 1979 she oversaw the return of the United States Army Chemical School from the Aberdeen Proving Ground near Edgewood, Maryland to its former home at Fort McClellan by the city of Anniston, Alabama. Now with three major missions, a basic Training Brigade, the Army Military Police School and the Army Chemical School, she became commander of the United States Army Military Police and Chemical Schools, Training Center, Fort McClellan, Alabama. It was the first time a woman commanded a major military installation. Clarke was the first woman to achieve the class of major general in the United States Army in 1978. In 1980 she was the first woman to complete 35 years of continuous active military service in the United States. She served in the army for a total thirty six years, retiring in 1981. This is the longest service ever served for a woman.

== Later life and death ==
Clarke in 1980 was in charge of human resources for the Deputy Chief of Staff in Washington, D.C. and was there until she went into retirement in 1981. In 1984 she was appointed by the Secretary of Defense to Women in the Services Defense Advisory Committee. She was elevated to Vice Chair in 1986. In 1989 she became a member, later Chair, of the Advisory Committee on Women Veterans. In 1992, she was a member of the Presidential Commission on the Assignment of Women in the Armed Forces. Clarke died June 10, 2011, in San Antonio, Texas and is buried at the Ft Sam Houston National Cemetery in Bexar County, Texas.

== Award and decorations ==

1st Row	Legion of Merit		
2nd Row	Meritorious Service Medal with oak leaf cluster	Army Commendation Medal with oak leaf cluster	Good Conduct Medal
3rd Row	Women's Army Corps Service Medal	American Campaign Medal	World War II Victory Medal
4th Row	Army of Occupation Medal with Berlin Airlift device and "GERMANY" clasp	Medal for Humane Action	National Defense Service Medal with oak leaf cluster

Clarke earned the Distinguished Service Medal, Legion of Merit, and Meritorious Service Medal with Oak Leaf Cluster. Her uniform was exhibited in a Pentagon display commemorating vital contributions of Army women pioneers.

== Promotions ==
- Enlisted – August 10, 1945
- Second lieutenant – September 29, 1949
- First lieutenant – September 7, 1953
- Captain – April 30, 1954
- Major – October 5, 1961
- Lieutenant colonel – November 24, 1965
- Colonel – 1972
- Brigadier general – 1975
- Major general – June 1978

== Bibliography ==
- Baron, Scott (1998). They Also Served: Military Biographies of Uncommon Americans. Military Information Enterprises. ISBN 978-1-877639-37-1.
- Franck, Irene M.; Brownstone, David M. (1995). Women's world: a timeline of women in history. HarperPerennial. ISBN 978-0-06-273336-8.
- Frank, Lisa Tendrich (2013). An Encyclopedia of American Women at War. ABC-CLIO. ISBN 978-1-59884-444-3.
- Morden, Betti J. (1990). The Women's Army Corps, 1945-1978. United States Army.
- Read, Phyllis J.; Witlieb, Bernard L. (1992). The Book of Women's Firsts: Breakthrough Achievements of Almost 1,000 American Women. Random House Information Group. ISBN 978-0-679-40975-5.
- US Army (1995). Soldiers. United States Department of the Army.
