= English Evangelical Church of the Reformation and Parish House =

Historic church in New York, United States

- Lutheran Church of the Reformation
- U.S. National Register of Historic Places
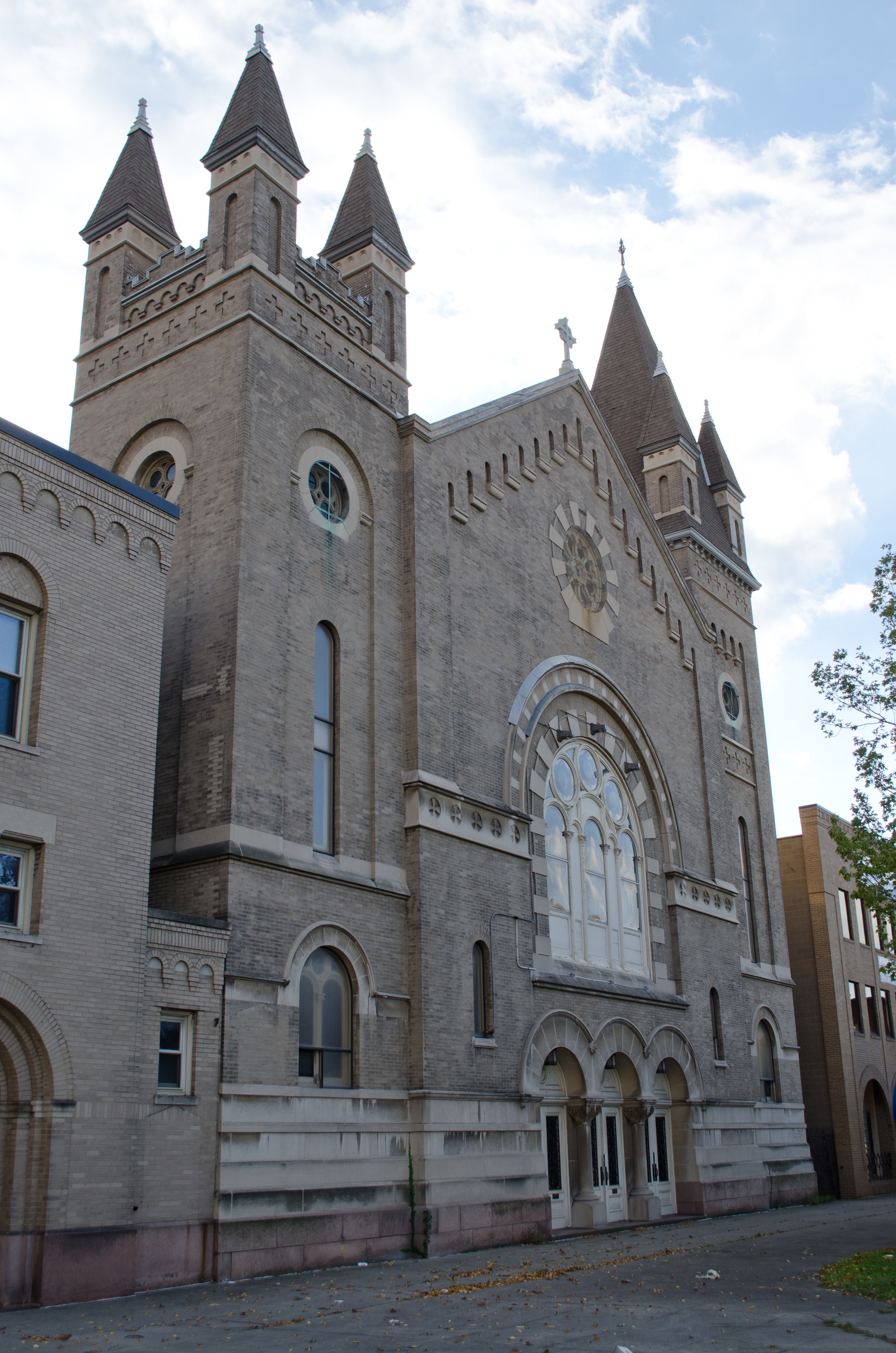
- Lutheran Church of the Reformation, October 2012

- Location within New York Location within the United States
- Location: 111 N. Chestnut St., Rochester, New York
- Coordinates: 43°9′32″N 77°36′12″W
- Area: 0.6 acres (0.24 ha)
- Built: 1900-1902
- Architect: Brockett, William; Gordon & Kaelber
- Architectural style: Late 19th and 20th Century Revivals, Late Romanesque Revival
- MPS: Inner Loop MRA
- NRHP reference No.: 92000150
- Added to NRHP: March 12, 1992

Lutheran Church of the Reformation, also known as Glory House International, is a historic church complex located at Rochester in Monroe County, New York. It was built in 1900–1902, and is a Late Romanesque Revival style sandy grey brick church with stone embellishments. It features two flanking towers of differing sizes on the main facade, round arched windows, corbel tables and stone window tracery. The larger tower has a steeply pitched pyramidal roof. Attached to the church by a hyphen is a three-story, less elaborate brick dependency.

It was listed on the National Register of Historic Places in 1992. In 2022, Reformation Lutheran Church merged with another Lutheran church and its building was purchased by Glory House International, a non-denominational African American congregation.

== Gallery ==
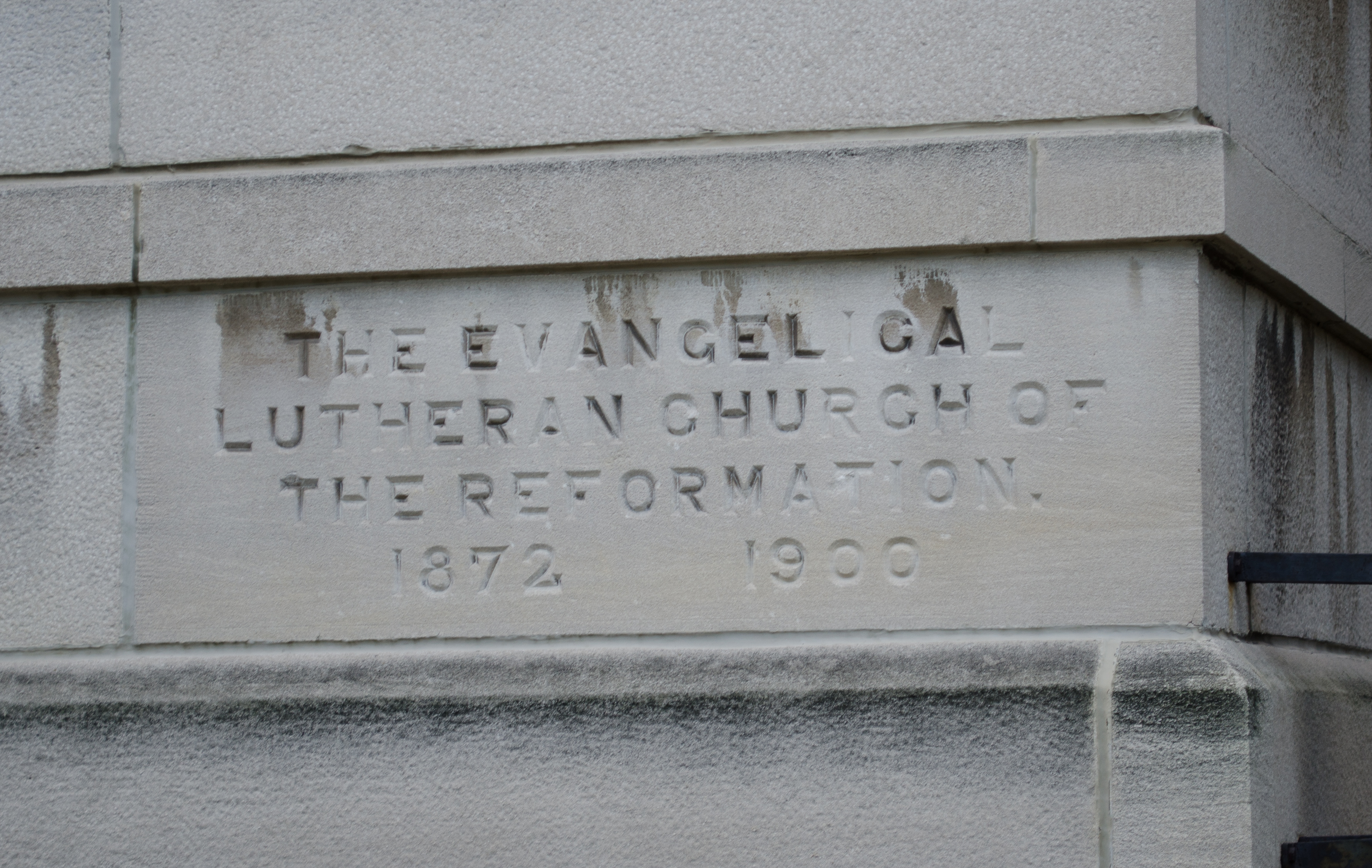
Church cornerstone

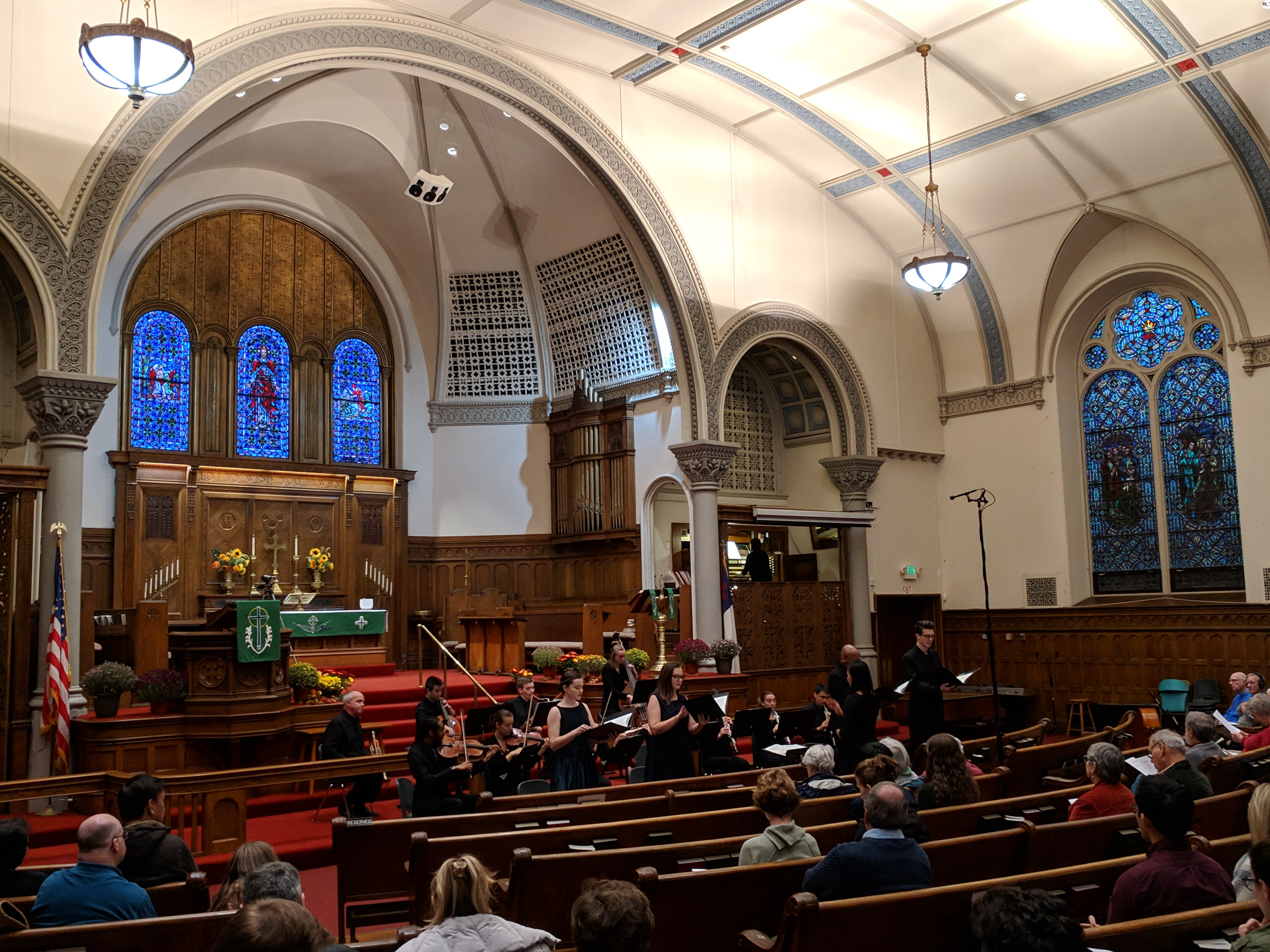
Interior of church
