= Rundel Memorial Library =

Historic library building in Rochester, New York

- Rundel Memorial Building
- U.S. National Register of Historic Places
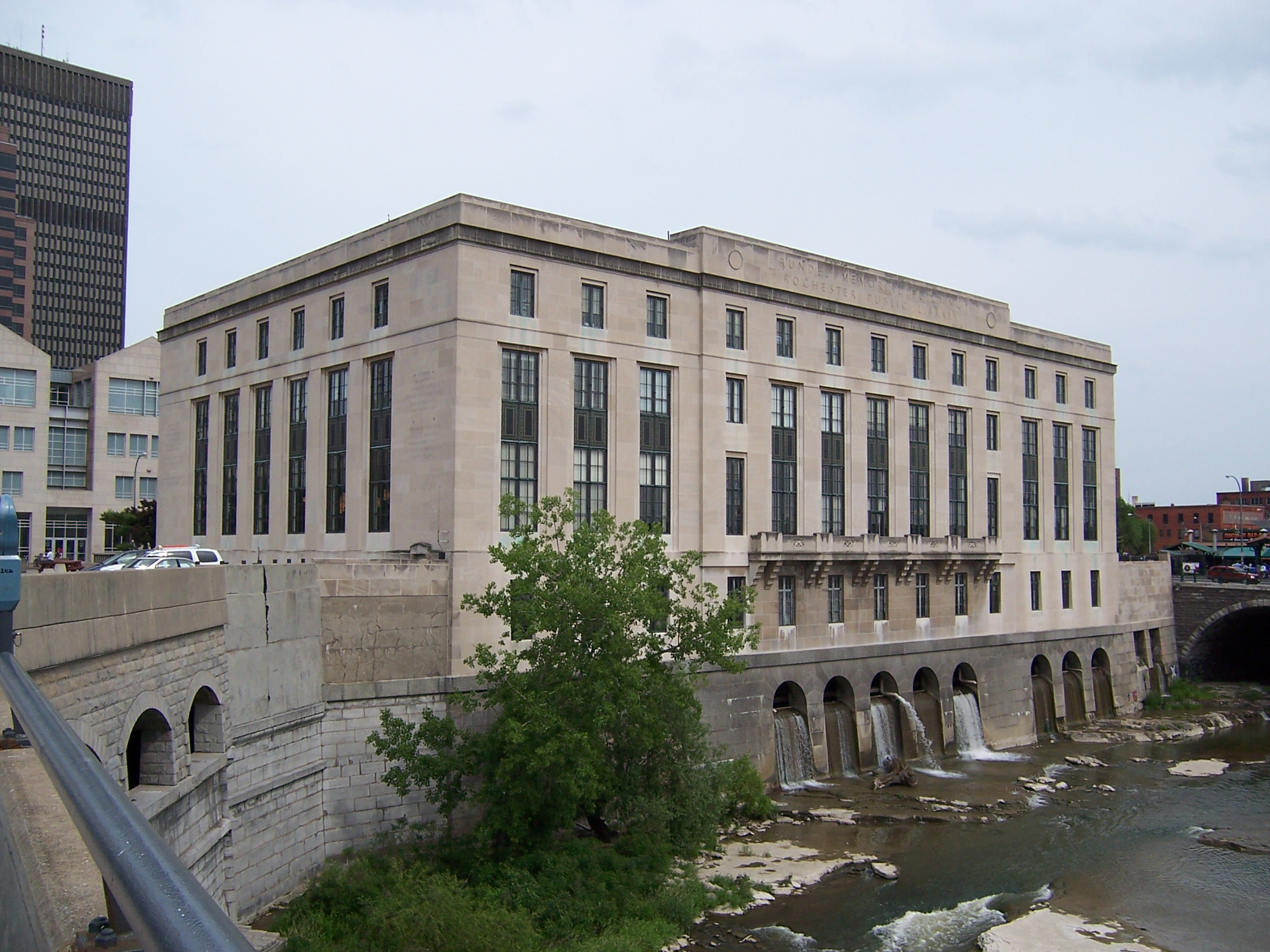
- The west side of the Rundel Memorial Building from across the Genesee River, June 2010

- Location within New York Location within the United States
- Location: 115 South Ave., Rochester, New York
- Coordinates: 43°09′15″N 77°36′29″W
- Area: less than one acre
- Built: 1933–1936
- Architect: Gordon & Kaelber
- Architectural style: Beaux Arts, Art Deco
- MPS: Inner Loop MRA
- NRHP reference No.: 85002845
- Added to NRHP: October 4, 1985

The Rundel Memorial Building is a historic library building located in Rochester, Monroe County, New York. Constructed between 1933 and 1936 as the original downtown site of the Rochester Public Library, it serves as part of the Central Library of Rochester and Monroe County along with the Bausch & Lomb Public Library Building across the street. The building was designed by the Rochester architectural firm Gordon & Kaelber and represents an integration of Beaux-Arts planning and massing with Art Deco detailing. It was listed on the National Register of Historic Places in 1985.

== History ==
=== Morton W. Rundel ===
When Rochester resident Morton W. Rundel died in 1911, he was little known in the community. However, public attention quickly turned to him when his will revealed a bequest of $400,000 to the City of Rochester for the construction of a library and fine arts building. Rundel was an art dealer who had acquired significant wealth through early investments in Eastman Kodak stock.

Numerous delays prevented immediate construction. Elizabeth Holmes, a nurse and fellow Spiritualist who had befriended Rundel in his final years, had received nearly all of his Kodak stock through transfers during his lifetime; a 1913 trial found that Holmes could retain all transfers except those made during Rundel's final three months of illness. Disputes also arose over whether to build a library or a fine arts building, the choice of location, and whether adequate funding was available. Rundel's heirs subsequently challenged the city's claim to the estate funds, resulting in the case Kibbe v. City of Rochester (57 F.2d 542, W.D.N.Y. 1932), which the courts ultimately decided in the city's favor. A portion of the funds ($353,968.82) was turned over to the city in March 1919, with the balance ($369,618.66) following in December 1928. By that time, the bequest had accrued interest and amounted to approximately one million dollars.

=== Construction and dedication ===
Ground was broken in December 1933 after the city secured a $314,000 federal grant from the Public Works Administration to supplement the Rundel fund. The Ohio-based Hunkin-Conkey Construction Company served as general contractor, though much of the workforce consisted of local men who had lost their jobs during the Great Depression.

The cornerstone, which bears the date 1934, was laid on June 15, 1935, in a ceremony officiated by Mayor Charles Stanton before an estimated crowd of 1,000 people. A time capsule placed in the cornerstone contained historical books about Rochester, photographs, newspapers, and other city records.

The Rundel Memorial Building was formally dedicated on October 4, 1936, with a ceremony held on the terrace at the main entrance. Speakers included Mayor Stanton, University of Rochester President Alan Valentine, Toronto Public Library Director George H. Locke, and Rochester Public Library Director John Adams Lowe. The building opened to the public the following day; reportedly over 3,200 books were checked out on the first day of operation.

== Architecture ==
The building was designed by the prominent Rochester architectural firm Gordon & Kaelber in what has been described as a modern interpretation of the Renaissance style. Constructed of North Carolina granite and Indiana limestone, the building measures 213 by 128 feet (65 by 39 m). It consists of three main floors, a mezzanine, two underground levels, a catwalk level above the river, and a penthouse area for equipment.

The building is sited along the east side of the Genesee River directly above the Johnson and Seymour millrace and the Rochester Subway. Granite arches at the library's foundation on the west elevation serve as spillways for diverted water flowing into the Genesee River below. The library was built on girders resting on cement and steel columns anchored into the bedrock.

=== Art and ornamentation ===
The building's exterior features sculptures by New York sculptor Ulysses Ricci. Two pylons on either side of the South Avenue façade depict symbols of various fields of learning; one shows a man with a scroll representing philosophy and biography, while a woman with a sword and two tablets represents history and religion. Three bronze figures installed above the entrance represent industry, art, and science.

A series of inscriptions appear on the building's exterior walls. Rochester Public Library Director John Adams Lowe either wrote or selected all the inscriptions. Lowe himself composed the phrase carved above the main entrance: "Books minister to man in his search for the enlightenment that reveals the meaning of life."

The interior features marble from England, France, and Germany, incorporating classical Greek decorative elements. Notable interior features include a bronze elevator adorned with images of Columbia and Athena, and an inlaid floor in the lobby decorated with zodiac signs. A central hall contains decorative light fixtures and a skylight.

== Collections ==
=== Local History & Genealogy Division ===
The building's second floor houses the Local History & Genealogy Division, the largest collection of primary and secondary source materials on the history of Rochester and the Genesee Valley in the region. Holdings include Rochester city directories dating to 1827, suburban directories from 1930, an index to local 19th-century newspapers, microfilmed census records, manuscript collections, trade catalogs, and local high school yearbooks. The division also houses the offices of the Rochester City Historian, the Monroe County Historian, and the Monroe County Historical Archives.

=== George W. Cooper Doll Collection ===
The building houses the George W. Cooper Doll Collection, which began as a 1934 school project exchanging Shirley Temple dolls with 69 countries and now numbers more than 200 dolls. The collection was originally displayed in a hidden room behind a functioning bookshelf in the Bausch & Lomb building's children's section, a feature that became a beloved attraction. The dolls were relocated to the Rundel building in 2022.

== Modern developments ==
On May 27, 1997, the $22.5 million Bausch & Lomb Public Library Building opened across South Avenue from the Rundel Building. An underground passage beneath South Avenue connects the two buildings, which together form the Central Library of Rochester and Monroe County. The Rundel Building also underwent a multi-million dollar restoration that same year.

=== Rehabilitation project ===
In 2019, several panels from the parapet fell off the building's west elevation due to deterioration caused by decades of freeze-thaw cycles and the building's original design lacking moisture mitigation within its wall systems. The Rochester Public Library and City of Rochester enlisted LaBella Associates for an initial assessment and retained local preservation firm Bero Architecture to develop a rehabilitation plan, with Jensen BRV Engineering and Vertical Access of Ithaca providing support.

Construction began with DGA Contractors undertaking exterior masonry repairs to stabilize the west façade, restore the original bronze windows, and provide appropriate masonry insulation and repointing to historic standards. The approximately $6.8 million project is primarily funded by American Rescue Plan Act funding allocated to the City of Rochester, with additional funding from library debt and a $500,000 construction grant from the New York State Department of Education, Division of Library Development.

The north terrace underwent a separate $9.8 million structural rehabilitation project, completed in 2022, that reconstructed it as a civic plaza with an ADA-accessible outdoor riverfront theater, tiered seating overlooking the Genesee River, and interpretive pavement features referencing the historic canal bed. The project was funded through Empire State Development's ROC the Riverway program, the Dormitory Authority of the State of New York, and the Friends and Foundation of the Rochester Public Library. The project received the Community Design Center of Rochester's Reshaping Rochester Design Award for large projects in 2022. A public art installation by Chevo Studios of Commerce City, Colorado, was commissioned as part of this project. The four installations, created by artist Andrew Dufford, highlight the relationship between the Genesee River and the surrounding city.

In October 2024, New York State Senator Jeremy Cooney announced $435,000 in state library construction aid for the replacement of the building's north elevator, part of a larger $1.5 million announcement for the Greece and Rochester Public Library systems.

== See also ==
- National Register of Historic Places listings in Rochester, New York
- Rochester Public Library
