= Gordon & Kaelber =

Gordon & Kaelber was an architectural firm of Rochester, New York, extant from 1918 to 1932. The partners included Edwin S. Gordon, who died in 1932, and William G. Kaelber. The firm was preceded by Gordon & Madden and Gordon, Madden & Kaelber, which included William V. Madden as partner.

A number of its works are listed on the National Register of Historic Places (NRHP).

Works include:

- Kodak Tower, skyscraper whose design is credited to Howard Wright Cutler when he worked for the firm.
- One or more works in Browncroft Historic District, roughly bounded by Browncroft Blvd., Newcastle, Blossom, and Winton Rds. Rochester, NY (Kaelber, William), NRHP-listed
- Eastman Dental Dispensary, 800 E. Main St. Rochester, NY (Gordon, Madden & Kaelber), NRHP-listed
- English Evangelical Church of the Reformation and Parish House, 111 N. Chestnut St. Rochester, NY (Gordon & Kaelber), NRHP-listed
- German United Evangelical Church Complex, 60–90 Bittner St. Rochester, NY (Gordon & Kaelber), NRHP-listed
- Reynolds Arcade, 16 E. Main St. Rochester, NY (Gordon & Kaelber), NRHP-listed
- Rundel Memorial Library, 115 South Ave. Rochester, NY (Gordon& Kaelber), NRHP-listed, architectural sculpture by Ulysses Ricci
- Saint Mark's and Saint John's Episcopal Church, 1245 Culver Rd. Rochester, NY (Gordon and Kaelber), NRHP-listed
- Saint Stanislaus Kostka Church, 1124 Hudson Ave. Rochester, NY (Gordon and Madden), NRHP-listed

The firm's drawings are being catalogued by the Rochester Historical Society.
