= Eastman Dental Dispensary =

- U.S. National Register of Historic Places
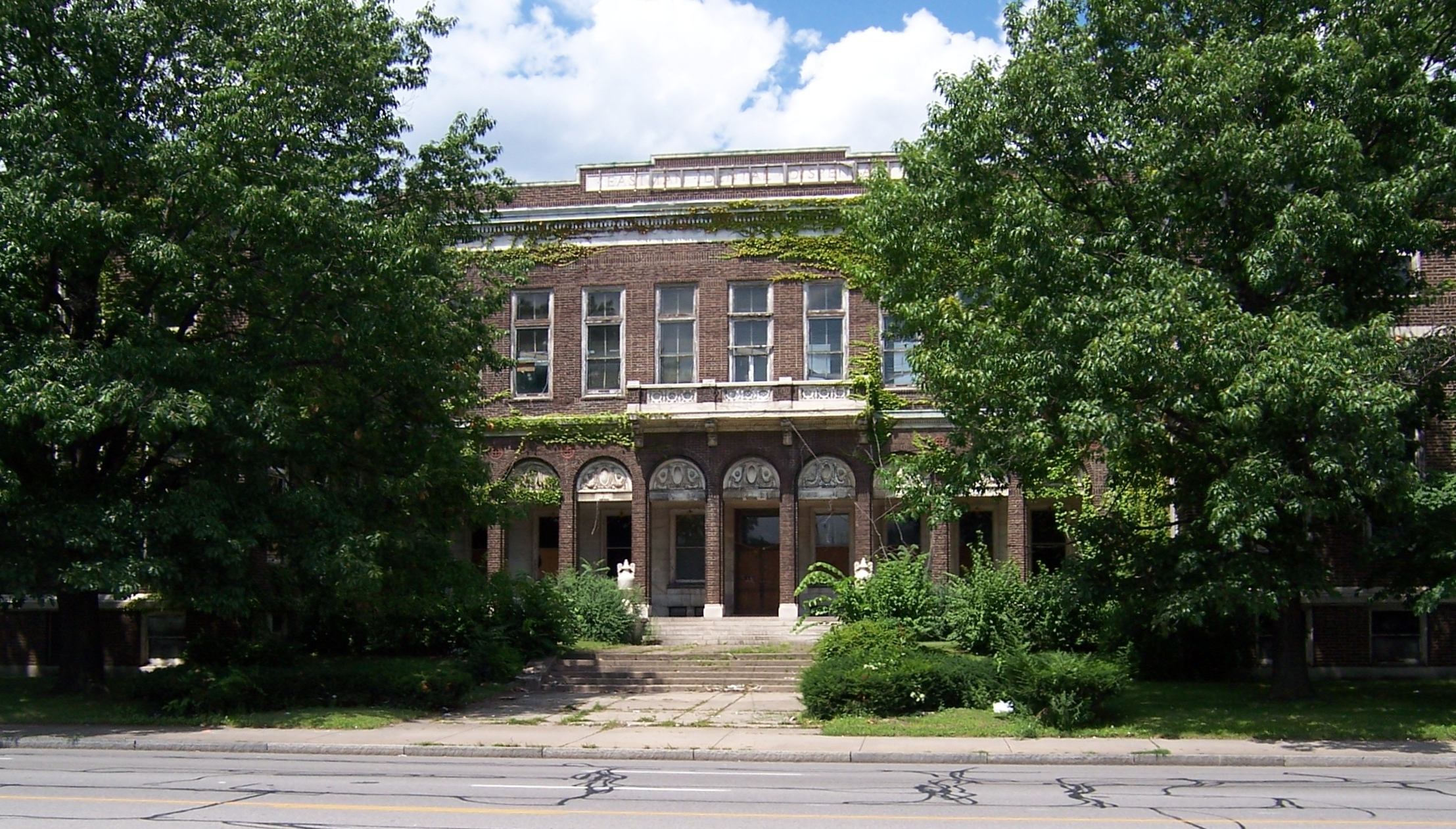

- Location within New York Location within the United States
- Location: 800 E. Main St., Rochester, New York
- Coordinates: 43°9′38″N 77°35′30″W
- Area: less than one acre
- Built: 1917
- Architect: Gordon, Madden & Kaelber
- Architectural style: Renaissance, Italian Renaissance
- NRHP reference No.: 83001708
- Added to NRHP: April 28, 1983

The Eastman Dental Dispensary was constructed between 1915 and 1917 in the Italian Renaissance architectural style by architects Gordon, Madden, and Kaelber. It was built as a free dental dispensary to serve the community of Rochester, New York, later expanding into throat and nose diseases. It fell into a state of disrepair after sitting vacant for close to four decades. The building was listed on the National Register of Historic Places in 1983.

== History ==
In October 1915, George Eastman provided the funds to build a free dispensary in Rochester, New York, that provided oral health benefits to the entire community.

This dispensary would serve as the central location for dental services in the Rochester community, supplementing many other smaller offsite locations that had been constructed by other area philanthropists such as Henry Lomb and William Bausch. On May 9, 1917, the dispensary was dedicated and on October 15, 1917, the dispensary officially opened to the public. 1917 also saw the graduation of the first class of the Dental Hygiene School.

Over the next few years, the dispensary continued to grow, prompting George Eastman to make an endowment of 1,000 additional Kodak stock shares in 1919. This endowment provided necessary funds for the dispensary to aid in the treatment of nose and throat disorders, as well as provide orthodontics services.

This endowment also provided the necessary means for the dispensary to open a tonsil-adenoid clinic. Mr. Eastman continued to be a major benefactor of the dispensary even into his death in 1932, leaving a bequest of an additional $1 million. In 1941 the dispensary officially gained its name as the Eastman Dental Dispensary.

By 1978, Eastman Dental, as the organization came to be known, moved to a new larger building, the Eastman Dental Center at the University of Rochester Medical Center campus. Following the move, the Eastman Dental Dispensary building sat vacant for close to four decades, and fell into a state of disrepair. It was listed on the National Register of Historic Places in 1983.

=== Eastman Gardens ===
In 2013, Home Leasing LLC, a for-profit developer of affordable housing based in Rochester, New York, announced plans to redevelop the Eastman Dental Dispensary into 57 rental apartments. On April 16, 2014, New York State Homes & Community Renewal (HCR) announced awards of $2,200,000 in Housing Trust Fund (HTF) program funds, $946,000 in federal Low-Income Housing Tax Credits (LIHTC) and $449,356 in New York State Low-Income Housing Credits (SLIHC) to the project.

On September 26, 2018, a ribbon cutting ceremony was held at the former dispensary to celebrate the opening of the new senior apartment community, named Eastman Gardens in honor of the building's original founder, George Eastman. The total cost of renovations and restorations totaled $20.7 million.

== See also ==
- Eastman Institute for Oral Health
