= Algernon Sidney Crapsey =

American Episcopal clergyman

Algernon Sidney Crapsey (1847–1927) was an American Episcopal clergyman who in 1906 was defrocked after a celebrated heresy trial.

== Family ==
Algernon Sidney Crapsey was born in Fairmount, Ohio on June 28, 1847. His maternal grandfather Senator Thomas Morris left Virginia because he opposed slavery to help settle Ohio. Morris was an Abolitionist. He served one term in the United States Senate. Crapsey "identified deeply" with his grandfather Morris, who was to him "a seer, a prophet, a hero, and a martyr."

Crapsey's father was a lawyer whose office was in nearby Cincinnati.

== Early life ==
When his father got into financial difficulty, Crapsey quit school at age eleven and took a job in a dry good store. When, after two years, his father recovered financially, Crapsey returned to school, but because he was the oldest boy in his class, he felt uncomfortable and quit school again and took a job in a hardware factory. After a co-worker called him "worthless," in August 1862, at age fourteen, Crapsey joined the army during the American Civil War. However, he was given a medical discharge the first winter after his enlistment and sent back to his home in Fairmount, Ohio.

Both at home and at his father's law office, Crapsey was bored. However, there was a library in the same building. Crapsey took advantage of the library to educate himself. He read Walter Scott, Charles Dickens, Washington Irving, Thomas Babington Macaulay, William Makepeace Thackeray, William H. Prescott, and the Bible. One evening in Cincinnati, Crapsey attended a service at Christ Church. He later looked back on the experience "as the hour of his conversion."

In 1863, Crapsey took a job as storekeeper in a salt yard in West Virginia. By the beginning of 1864, he was back in Cincinnati. He found a job there as a bookkeeper in a printing company. To improve his qualifications for the job, he attended night classes. Nevertheless, Crapsey was fired. His next job was in the Dead Letter Office in Washington, D.C. for six months.

Crapsey's uncle persuaded him that there were more opportunities in New York City. He found a job as bookkeeper and cashier in a print shop.

== Ministry in the Episcopal Church ==
While working in New York City, Crapsey attended services at Christ Episcopal Church. The Rev. Ferdinand Cartwright Ewer was the rector. This was another turning point in Crapsey's life. Ewer influenced Crapsey to seek ordination in the Episcopal church. To receive the education required for ordination, he attended St. Stephen's College, Annandale, New York for two years. He then attended the General Theological Seminary in New York City for three years, graduating with a degree in divinity.

Crapsey was ordained a deacon on June 30, 1872, and a priest on October 5, 1873.

After ordination, Crapsey worked in St. Paul's Chapel of Trinity Church in New York City.

During his time in St. Paul's Chapel of Trinity Church, Crapsey married Adelaide Trowbridge, whose father was a Catskill, New York newspaper man. The couple had nine children.

=== St. Andrew's Mission ===
The father of one of Crapsey's seminary friends persuaded Crapsey to leave St. Paul's Chapel to serve in St. Andrew's Mission, Rochester, New York. So Crapsey, with his wife and three small children, moved to Rochester. On June 1, 1879, he began his work in St. Andrew's mission, located in a mostly Roman Catholic neighborhood.

In St. Andrew's, Crapsey and his wife entered into the lives of the people. During the first summer, Crapsey had classes for the children in which he taught them about plants and how they grow.

For the women, Mrs. Crapsey organized women's groups. For the men, Crapsey organized the St. Andrew's Brotherhood. The organization did charitable work and promoted religious education. The Brotherhood grew to three hundred members, but not all were members of St. Andrews. The Brotherhood was as a "Mutual Benefit Society." Payments were made to sick members, to the widows of members, and to the members who lost their wives.

In addition to his work with the Brotherhood and traditional parish duties, Crapsey led retreats for the Sisters of St. Mary, an Episcopal religious order in Peekskill, NY. He lectured at black Episcopal churches, urging members to stand up for their rights. In Rochester, Crapsey was one of the founders and the first president of the Citizens Political Reform Association, which worked for civic improvement in the face of the poverty caused by the Depression of 1893. He visited people in asylums and prisons.

Together, the Crapseys established the first training school for kindergarten teachers in Rochester. They also began a night school with classes in "domestic science and mechanical arts."

In 1897, Crapsey published a book entitled A Voice in the Wilderness. In it, he made five statements affirming his orthodoxy:

- He reaffirmed the vows which he made at the time of his ordination.
- He professed his belief that the Holy Scriptures are the Word of God.
- He professed his belief, explicit and implicit, in the Apostles' and Nicene Creeds.
- He professed his use and veneration of the Sacraments as the means of union between the soul and God.
- He said that he was ready to follow the Bishops and others who are set over him in the Lord.

While at St. Andrew's, the Crapseys lost two daughters. Ruth died of undulant fever in 1898 at age eleven and daughter Emily died in 1901 at age 24 of appendicitis.

The twenty-fifth anniversary of the Crapsey's coming to St. Andrew's was on June 1, 1904. The congregation had a special service to celebrate the occasion and gave him gifts. A Rochester newspaper extolled Crapsey as "a power for good in the community for 25 years."

Crapsey published a book in 1905 entitled Religion and Politics. It was based on a series of lectures in which Crapsey "advocated that the church become involved in social reform."

=== Opposition to ecclesiastical authority ===
In his autobiography, Crapsey says that he had been a heretic from his tenth year. "A heretic," he says, "is one who thinks and gives voice to his own thought," and has difficulty submitting to authority. Crapsey characterizes himself as a "Humanist," who took God for granted. His allegiance to Jesus was based on His humanity more than on His divinity.

Crapsey pictured himself "as a simple parish priest, primarily concerned with the welfare of his parishioners." However, he was not satisfied with "the dogma of the church" and he felt it is duty to speak publicly about this fact.

Crapsey wanted to be elected a bishop, but, when he was not, he declared himself a "prophet." From his perspective this office was more important than that of a bishop, and it lifted him above "mundane denominationalism." Rather than accept the truth and historicity of the Bible merely because they were part of the "historic Christian faith" as received by his church, turned to "developments in scientific research" and to "higher criticism" of the Bible. Crapsey was "proud to acknowledge his heresy" because of his "rebellious, yet ethical heritage demanded it."

=== Conflict with Bishop Walker ===
There has been a broad agreement in the literature on the subject that the action against Crapsey was the work of Bishop William David Walker as "a strong-willed bishop" and of "conservatives" in the diocese. However, in his article "Algernon Sidney Crapsey and the Move for Presentment," Stephen Todd Neese documents Crapsey's "incessant public exhibition" and his "prodding the diocese" until it finally resulted in his trial.

In 1885, Crapsey was feeling "discouragement," both because of "a sense of personal failure" and "a disillusionment in the Christian Church as a whole." He described his disillusionment in a sermon at a Presbyterian Church in Rochester. This occasioned Crapsey's first run-in with Bishop Walker because Walker had specifically forbidden Crapsey to preach in a Presbyterian Church.3

In 1901, Crapsey published a tractate with the title "The Law of Liberty: The Nature and Limit of Religious Thought." In the tractate, he wrote, "a free thinker has for ages been feared and hated by the officers of the church." Furthermore, a man who "gives himself over entirely" to a sect "no longer asks himself what is true." Crapsey observed that this is the "sad condition" of most of "the Protestant clergy." This was true in his opinion because "theological schools" teach "a fully formulated system of beliefs."

In December 1904, Crapsey began a series of Sunday evening lectures at St. Andrew's, which ended on February 18, 1905. As the lectures became "more unorthodox" they attracted greater notice in the press and by the diocese. He called the final lecture "Religion and Politics." In the lecture, Crapsey specifically questioned two articles of the Apostles' Creed. He said that "the Virgin Birth" and the "resurrection of Jesus" were legends, not facts. He implied that Jesus was "wrong about various teachings," and he "denied the deity of Christ and the validity of the supernatural." Because Crapsey believed in his "own merit," he did not need "the redemptive atonement of Christ," which orthodoxy held to be required. The lecture was reported in newspapers nationwide. Bishop Walker demanded a retraction, but Crapsey refused.

After the lectures ended, Crapsey continued to promulgate his views by publishing them the following summer in a book entitled Religion and Politics.

On September 2, 1905, the New Outlook published an article by Crapsey under the title "Honor Among Clergymen". In it, Crapsey quoted the Pastoral Letter of the House of Bishops issued after its meeting at the Episcopal Church's General Convention of October 5–25, 1904. In Crapsey's quotation, the Bishops said that any person in the Church "who has lost his hold on eternal verities" should "in the name of common honesty, . . . be silent or withdraw." Crapsey replied, with implied reference to himself, for "any true, brave-hearted man . . . silence is impossible and withdrawal is treason." Furthermore, he said that "unless the prophet is ready to face the doom of the prophet, he should not undertake on the prophet's office." Thus, by now Crapsey had taken issue not only with Bishop Walker, but with the whole House of Bishops.

The Committee of Investigation had done little until Crapsey's New Outlook article propelled it into action. The chairman invited Crapsey to meet with it on September 5, 1905. Crapsey replied that he would meet with the committee if he could bring two or three of his "friends among the Clergy" who believed and felt as he did about the matter in hand. The committee rejected Crapsey's request on the basis that its mission was "to ascertain facts," not to engage in "a theological debate."

The Committee of Investigation met on September 26, 1905, and decided that a sub-committee of two clergymen should meet with Crapsey. They went to meet with him at St. Andrew's the next day. Crapsey was asked two questions. The questions included the qualification of taking the fact of "various interpretations into consideration." The two questions were whether he believed that "the Holy Scriptures are the Word of God" and whether he held the Apostles' Creed as "the true Creed of the Church and contains the essentials of salvation." By keeping the "various interpretations" qualification in mind, Crapsey could truthfully answer both questions in the affirmative. Crapsey's affirmative answers transformed the meeting from an investigation into a friendly gathering with refreshments. Before the two clergymen left, one asked Crapsey to write down his answers. He agreed to do so with the questions and his answers recorded verbatim. As they left, one of the men assured Crapsey that there would be no trial.

Two other members of the sub-committee met with Crapsey on October 3, 1905. They suggested that he write his answers to the two questions posed to him at the September meeting "to provide a written record." There are conflicting accounts of what followed. According to diocesan records, Crapsey wrote his answers later and then submitted them to the investigating committee. In contrast, Crapsey said that the three men at the meeting worked together preparing "a document for submission to the bishop." He wrote later that, if the document had been submitted as written, there would have been no "trial for heresy," but that it "was not so submitted."

On October 24, 1905, the sub-committee asked the ten clergymen who had "submitted grievances" to submit their evidence of Crapsey's heresy. Only one submitted an affidavit and it was based on a personal conversation with Crapsey. A second said he would not submit one until he could know more about the committee's proceedings. The other eight had nothing more to offer except their opinions about Crapsey's book Religion and Politics.

After the meetings, the issue was kept alive in the press. The Church Standard criticized the diocese for taking too long to settle the question. Crapsey wrote two letters to the diocese expressing the same opinion. The case was argued in church periodicals. The Church Standard and The Living Church supported the prosecution. The New York Churchman and the Pacific Churchman supported Crapsey.

The investigating committee completed its work in November 1905, but it did not submit its report to Bishop Walker immediately. During this interim, Walker made an address at St. James Church in Rochester. He said that he stood up "for the faith of the Catholic Church as it is taught in the Gospel, as it is taught in the Creed." Furthermore, he stated that he could not "sympathize with the man who teaches anything contrary to that which he has promised to teach."

In its report to the bishop, Walker's Committee of Investigation was "undivided in its denunciation of Crapsey's position." However, only two of the five members "found sufficient grounds to present Crapsey for heresy." In the judgment of these two members, there was "sufficient evidence to secure conviction in the event of trial." When the committee's report was made public on November 17, 1905, it was "vigorously condemned" by The Living Church and The Church Standard called the report "scandalous."

An editorial in The Outlook, Volume 81 (September 30, 1905) on "The Liberty of Prophesying" suggested that Crapsey might keep quiet about his disagreements. The editorial pointed out that many a clergyman in Crapsey's situation "remains in the Church and keeps silent upon the uncertain doctrines." But Crapsey would not stop publicly promulgating his views because, for him, "silence constituted acquiescence" and he refused to "compromise." He preferred what he perceived as "martyrdom."

Crapsey continued to express his views in public forums. On December 3, 1905, he began another series of Sunday evening lectures at St. Andrew's. The topic was the second coming of Jesus. Crapsey said that there would be no second coming in a literal sense; it happens only in the heart of people. The lecture "caused deep concern on the part of the diocese."

Given the deep concerns about these further public statements by Crapsey, Bishop Walker deemed the recommendation by his investigating committee that Crapsey should not be charged with heresy to be unsatisfactory. He took further action by calling a meeting of the Standing Committee for December 23. 1905. More generally, Crapsey was being ostracized within the diocese. At the consecration of a church, clergy were seated in the chancel, but Crapsey was seated in the nave. Bishop Walker's message stressed the ordination vows to "hold and teach the doctrine of God as this Church has received the same." Walker would not "allow the situation to continue without consequences."

The consequences began by the Standing Committee's appointing a committee to "prepare a presentment" against Crapsey.

== Heresy charges ==
There has been a broad agreement in the literature on the subject that the action against Crapsey was the work of "a strong-willed bishop and conservatives." However, in his article "Algernon Sidney Crapsey and the Move for Presentment," Stephen Todd Neese documents Crapsey's "incessant public exhibition" and his "prodding the diocese" until it finally resulted in his trial.

When Episcopal clergy called on Bishop Walker to investigate what Crapsey was teaching, Walker wrote members of St. Andrew's asking for first-hand reports. Crapsey wrote Walker questioning "the legality of his intrusion" into his parish. Faced with Crapsey's opposition to the bishop's corresponding with his parishioners, Walker followed his Standing Committee's advice and set up a "Committee of Investigation." Its first formal meeting was July 19, 1905.

On February 23, 1906, the Standing Committee voted unanimously to present Crapsey for heresy. Before the presentment was delivered to Crapsey, Walker, in a pastoral effort, tried to convince Crapsey to "take some time off and reconsider his position." However, Crapsey was not willing to reconsider his position. He wanted "total exoneration." Therefore, on March 3, 1906, Walker gave the "presentment against Crapsey" to the diocesan chancellor who delivered it to Crapsey. The members of the Ecclesiastical Court had already been elected.

"Crapsey was presented on two charges." The first charge alleged that Crapsey had held and taught publicly and privately "doctrine contrary to that held by this Church." The second charge alleged that Crapsey had violated his ordination vows."

Soon after the presentment had been delivered to Crapsey, fifteen prominent members of the diocese (seven lay and eight clergy) wrote Walker "urging him to postpone the trial until after the election of the new diocesan council in May. Nevertheless, the trial was set for April 17, 1906.

=== Trial and deposition ===
Crapsey's heresy trial and the events leading up to it were reported and discussed by the press and the religious journals of the Episcopal Church. The story "held the interest of the nation for nearly two years."

For the most detailed account of Crapsey's heresy trial one would read Crapsey's autobiography The Last of the Heretics published in 1924 when he was seventy-five years old. However. Crapsey's account is marred by his "self-aggrandizing." However, two people have written more objective accounts: Carolyn Swanton in her essay "Dr. Algernon S. Crapsey" and Stephen Todd Neese in his article "Algernon Sidney Crapsey and the Move for Presentment" in Anglican and Episcopal History Vol. 70, No. 3 (September 2001) and in his book Algernon Sidney Crapsey: The Last of the Heretics (Cambridge Scholars Publishing, 2009). Therefore, the following account will be based on these works.

Walker commanded Crapsey to appear before an ecclesiastical court held in St. James Church, Batavia, New York. The "presentment charge" was that Crapsey "did openly, advisedly, publicly and privately utter, avow, declare, and teach doctrines contrary to those held and received by the church."

Besides witnesses from St. Andrews for Crapsey's defense, clergy came from other parishes in the diocese, as well as a large delegation from Boston. So many people came to the trial that it had to be moved to the Batavia Court House to accommodate them. Among the people who came to the trial were "experts on theology" and "eminent churchmen" whom Crapsey had lined up as witnesses for his defense, but none of them were allowed to testify.

=== Closing arguments ===
Closing arguments began on April 27, 1906:

- In its closing arguments, the prosecution alleged that Crapsey, "an officer of his Church in his official capacity, denies the fundamental doctrines of his Church," and demanded "a verdict of guilty."
- One of Crapsey's attorneys James Breck Perkins said in his closing argument that it certainly is not heresy to say that "God is Love" which was the main thesis of the defendant's lectures and writings.
- In his own concluding remarks, Crapsey said that he was not charged with any moral offence, but only with having said things which the prosecution claims were unlawful for him to say.

On May 9, 1906, the five-member Ecclesiastical Court met and by a four to one vote decided Crapsey was guilty. The Court's findings were then forwarded to Bishop Walker. The verdict was delivered to Crapsey on May 15, 1906. The story was carried all of the nation's major newspapers.

An appeal to the Court of Review was filed on June 6, 1906, giving eleven reasons why an appeal should be granted. The complete argument by Crapsey's counsel Edward M. Shephard on October 19, 1906. for appealing Crapsey's verdict can be read at "Argument for Appeal." The complete argument against appeal by John Lord O'Brian, the Church Advocate for the Diocese of Western New York, can be read at

The Court of Review unanimously affirmed the guilty decision of the diocesan Ecclesiastical Court. On November 20, 1906, the clerk of the Court of Review delivered the decision to Bishop Walker. The decision was then delivered to Crapsey. Rather than wait to be deposed by Bishop Walker, Crapsey wrote the bishop asking to be deposed. This action gave him a bit of control over what was taking place.

Walker was quoted as saying, that the Crapsey affair was "the most painful happening" in his life. The bishop said: "I have known and respected Dr. Crapsey for many years and have honored and respected him for his great abilities. I have great affection for him and have watched him as he grew up in Church work, so the matter of the present gives me great pain." Crapsey did Walker a favor by asking for his deposal by letter. By sending Walker his resignation, Crapsey relieved Walker of the duty of deposing.

=== Removal from St. Andrew's ===
After the Appeal was denied, Crapsey was given until the end of the year to leave St. Andrew's. Many of his parishioners were "heartbroken at the loss of their rector." On December 4, 1906, Crapsey gave his last sermon to a capacity congregation.

== Life after deposition ==
William Rossiter Seward, who was neither a parishioner nor a friend of Crapsey, financed a new home for the Crapseys. Even though Rossiter did not know Crapsey personally, he supported Crapsey's work in Rochester. Seward later helped finance the education of the Crapseys' children.

=== The Brotherhood ===
Outside of the Episcopal Church, "Crapsey went right back to what he had always done," but without the confines of ecclesiastical authority. Crapsey gave his efforts to his Brotherhood for "social and religious reform." For this work, he added Walter Rauschenbusch, who was "a young and radical minister." Crapsey reorganized what previously had been the brotherhood of Andrew's as the Brotherhood. The Brotherhood served as Crapsey's congregation. He taught Sunday School and "considered himself the pastor of the Brotherhood." Membership in the Brotherhood was open to people of any "race, nationality, class or creed." The Brotherhood's purpose was "to unify the race of mankind in God and in one another." As pastor of the Brotherhood, Crapsey often gave eulogies at funerals.

Crapsey divided the Brotherhood into two departments. The work of the Department of Social Betterment included sewing and donating clothing, providing medical and toilet supplies, visiting the sick, and providing foodstuff including Thanksgiving and Christmas dinners for the needy. The Lecture Department gave lectures which promoted "both the new religiosity and other humanitarian ideas." They were so popular that they had to be moved from the Unitarian Church to the Lyceum Theater."

As a deposed clergyman, Crapsey's world was much larger and less restricted than it had been as a priest. His activities in 1907 illustrated the scope of his new world. He published a book entitled The Re-birth of Religion. He spoke at the Ethical Society in Philadelphia. While there, he met many prominent people. In 1907, he was a delegate to the International Peace Conference at the Hague. After he returned, Crapsey worked for six years as a parole officer.

In 1912, Crapsey was sixty-five years old, but he continued his activity. He delivered twenty-three lectures on the "moral and spiritual" aspects of "politics and economic problems." The lectures were given in six cities. In Rochester, Crapsey taught a class on Wednesday evenings. As a pastor, he officiated at ten wedding and twelve funerals, he "visited the sick and the needy," and he did counseling.

By this time, Crapsey had become a socialist. In October 1912, Crapsey learned of a strike at a mill in Little Falls, New York. In spite of the fact that both public assembly and public speaking were prohibited, Crapsey spoke to a crowd in a park next to the mill about the Sermon on the Mount. A police officer arrested him and took him to jail. At the jail, the Little Falls police chief asked him to "please go home." Crapsey replied, "I can't go home I'm under arrest." The chief told the judge that Crapsey was charged with "disorderly conduct." Crapsey pleaded "not guilty." The judge then discharged Crapsey.

Before the end of 1912, Crapsey took the job of a parole officer, a job he held six years. He needed to earn more money to help support his family, partly because he was earning less money on the lecture circuit. After his work as a parole officer, Crapsey retired to write his autobiography The Last of the Heretics, which was published in 1924. Now he was being cared for by his "family and friends." Mrs. Crapsey contributed to the family's income with her business of designing, making, and selling dresses for young girls. She was so successful that she was able to hire seamstresses.

On October 4, 1914, the Crapsey's daughter Adelaide, a published poet, died of tuberculosis.

In his seventies, Crapsey wrote his fourth book about the "historic development" of religion. The Ways of the Gods, published in 1924, was a "Marxist interpretation" of the development.

== Last days and death ==
Crapsey suffered poor health in his late seventies, but for his eightieth birthday on June 28, 1927, many friends visited him. He later said that it was the "happiest day in his life." However, Crapsey became ill before the following Christmas. He died on December 31, 1927. He was survived by his wife, two sisters, five children and six grandchildren. A Presbyterian minister officiated at Crapsey's private funeral. Crapsey's ashes were placed in the family plot at Mt Hope Cemetery in Rochester.

After his death, the press remembered Crapsey "as being honest, tolerant and kind." He fought for what he believed in, but did not try to force his beliefs on anyone. He was a Good Samaritan. One account recalled that Crapsey had taken coal and food to a needy family, that he read to blind workers, that he counseled prisoners and bereaved relatives, and admitted hoodlums into his night school classes. In summary, the Rochester press remembered how Crapsey had "worked tirelessly for a better city."

== Works ==
This list is divided into three sections: books and articles by Crapsey, works about Crapsey, and works about Crapsey's heresy trial.

=== Books and articles by Crapsey ===
- Meditations on the Five Joyful Mysteries (New York: J. Pott & Co., 1888)
- The Man and the Movement: A Monograph upon the Life and Work of John Henry Newman so far as These Relate to the Catholic Movement in the Church of the English (New York: J. Pott & Co., 1890).
- A Voice in the Wilderness (New York: James Pott & Co., 1897). In this book Crapsey implores for "a restoration of primitive Christianity" which could be partially accomplished by dioceses with fewer clergy. This would, he holds, enable the Bishop to give more pastoral care to his clergy.
- The Story of a Simple Life (Bible House, 1900).
- Political Crimes and Their Consequences (1901).
- A Constitutional Defense of the Negro. Delivered at a Mass Meeting of Citizens in the Metropolitan A.M.E. Church, Washington, D.C., December 15, 1901.
- The Greater Love (New York: Abbey Press, 1902, 2nd ed.). This work is a novel in which the heroine was "one of the working poor" and the hero was an Episcopal priest who was deposed for his "ethical principles." The novel was laced with the themes of "works righteousness and martyrdom" from Crapsey's own character.
- "Prison Methods." in Documents of the Senate of the State of New York, Volume 5 (New York State Legislature Senate, 1902), 83–90.
- Tractates (Jacobs, 1899-1902). Tracts included are "The Disappointment of Jesus Christ" (1899), "The Royal Priesthood" (1900), "The Pastoral Rod and Staff" (1900), "The Answer to Pilate" (1899), "The Judgement of Abraham" (1900), "The Law of Liberty" (1901), "God's Winnowing Fan" (1901), and "The Church: the School of the Saints" (1902).
- Algernon Sidney Crapsey, Religion and Politics (Thomas Whittaker, 1905).
- "Passive Resistance: Jesus' Method of Government." From chapter four Religion and Politics (Boston: American Peace Society, 1905.)
- "Honor Among Clergymen" in New Outlook, Volume 81 (Outlook Publishing Company, September 2, 1905), 25–29. The article is also available online at "Honor Among Clergymen" in New Outlook, Volume 81 (Outlook Publishing Company, September 2, 1905), 25-29.
- "Word of Farewell": Crapsey's last sermon at St. Andrew's, Christmas 1906.
- The Re-birth of Religion; Being an Account of the Passing of the Old and Coming of the New Dogmatic (New York: John Lane Co., 1907).
- Did Jesus Really Live? (Chicago, Original Research Society, 1908). A debate in which Crapsey takes the affirmative position against M. M. Mangasarian.
- The Rise of the Working-class (New York, The Century Co., 1914.)
- "Militarism and the Church". An article from the Annals of the American Academy of Political and Social Science, Vol. 66, July 1, 1916.
- International Republicanism: the Way to Permanent Peace (Society for Ethical Culture, 1918).
- The Ways of the Gods (New York, The International Press, 1921).
- The Last of the Heretics (Alfred A. Knopf, 1924).

=== Works about Crapsey ===
- Argument of Edward M. Shepard as Counsel for the Rev. Algernon S. Crapsey, S.T.D. Before the Court of Review of the Protestant Episcopal Church upon His Appeal from the Judgment of the Court of the Diocese of Western New York (October 19, 1906).
- Stephen T. Neese, Algernon Sidney Crapsey: the Last of the Heretics (Newcastle, UK: Cambridge Scholars Pub., 2007).
- Karen Alkalay-Gut, Alone in the Dawn: The Life of Adelaide Crapsey (University of Georgia Press, 2008) contains two chapters about the heresy trial of Adelaide Crapsey's father Algernon Sidney Crapsey: "The Heresy" and "The Verdict.".

=== Works about Crapsey's trial ===
- James Breck Perkins, Court of Review: In the Matter of the Presentment of the Reverend Algernon Sidney Crapsey, D. D., for Trial Upon Certain Charges
- The argument made for appeal of the decision of the Ecclesiastical Court of the Diocese of Western New York by Edward Morse Shepard in Argument of Edward M. Shepard as Counsel for Algernon S. Crapsey: before the Court of Review of the Protestant Episcopal Church Upon his Appeal from the Judgment of the Court of the Diocese of Western New York (October 19, 1906).
- The argument made against appeal of the decision of the Ecclesiastical Court of the Diocese of Western New York by John Lord O’Brian, the Church Advocate for the Diocese of Western New York.
