= Adelaide T. Crapsey =

American businesswoman

Adelaide Trowbridge Crapsey
- Born: March 7, 1855 Catskill, New York US
- Died: January 8, 1950 (aged 94) Rochester, New York, US
- Occupation: Businessperson
- Spouse: Algernon Sidney Crapsey (m. 1875)

Adelaide Trowbridge Crapsey (1855–1950) was an American philanthropist, social reformer, clergyman's wife, and businesswoman. Her company made dresses for girls and sold them all over the United States and in many foreign countries. The way her company cared for its employees was commended by the state of New York and in Nation's Health, a national magazine. She was the wife of the American Episcopal priest and social reformer Algernon Sidney Crapsey and the mother of the American poet Adelaide Crapsey.

== Early life ==
Adelaide Trowbridge was born on March 7, 1855, in Catskill, New York.

Her father was Marcus H. Trowbridge (1827–1891), who had moved to Catskill with his father. After completing his schooling, he learned the printing trade and became the owner of the Catskill Examiner newspaper. Her mother was Harriet G. Trowbridge (1831–1907).

Adelaide Trowbridge had one sibling, her brother Arthur Hunt Trowbridge (1858–1883).

She married the Rev. Algernon S. Crapsey (1847–1927) on June 2, 1875, in St. Paul's Chapel of Trinity Church in New York City, where he was serving as a recently ordained minister in the Episcopal Church. The couple had nine children, of which three were born in New York City and six in Rochester.

Jean Webster, the Vassar College roommate and lifelong friend of her daughter Adelaide, the poet, noted that "Dr. and Mrs. Crapsey weren't the ideal parents for a large family."

After their marriage, her husband continued his busy work as a priest, which allowed the couple only two or three nights a week for courting and having guests.

== Social work ==
In 1879, Mrs. Crapsey's husband accepted a call to St. Andrew's Episcopal Church in Rochester, NY, where he conducted his first service on June 1. Mr. Crapsey first moved to Rochester alone. She and her three children stayed for a while with her Trowbridge family in Catskill, which lies between New York and Rochester when traveling by water. Then she and her children traveled to Rochester by Hudson River steamer and Erie Canal boat and arrived on July 1. When she arrived and saw the rectory in which the family was to live, she felt "utterly cast down". There was no bath, nor proper sanitary provisions. She also felt "utter loneliness", but this was soon replaced by activity. She landscaped the front yard of the rectory and the grounds around the church. Her work was described as lovely and very English.

In addition to the improvements she made in the church buildings, Mrs. Crapsey ministered to the needs of the parishioners and other people. She provided clothing, some made by her and some used, for all ages: from layettes for babies to overcoats for old men. She continued this kind of ministry throughout her life. She became widely known in Rochester for organizing aid for young mothers, widows, and children. She helped her husband in working with boys who belonged to the mischievous gangs in the Averill Avenue district in which they lived. This work "resulted in disappearance of the gangs".

Crapsey also worked with her husband in establishing the first kindergarten in Rochester. She worked with the women of St. Andrew's and organized them to do charitable work. Mrs. Crapsey persuaded her husband to start the first training school for kindergarten teachers in Rochester. Both Crapseys began and taught in a night school with classes in "domestic science and mechanical arts."

In the summer of 1874, Crapsey accompanied her husband to the island of Bermuda where he conducted a preaching mission.

When her husband received word that he was finally removed from office in November 1906, he went into St. Andrew's Church and walked up and down the aisle "mourning the death of his ministerial life", and she came over from the rectory and comforted him.

Crapsey made a significant contribution to studies of the poetry and life of her daughter Adelaide Crapsey by keeping a scrapbook of her letters. Mrs. Crapsey's scrapbook is one of the only two collections of Adelaide's letters.

In 1914, the Dau's Society Blue Book listing of prominent residents of Rochester listed Mr. and Mrs. Algernon S. (Trowbridge) Crapsey and their three children who were living at home.

In 1922, the Consumers' League of New York listed her as a member of the board of governors.

She was described as an attractive and dignified woman by her daughter's biographer Karen Alkalay-Gut.

== The Adelaide T. Crapsey Company ==
In her husband's older years, when he was earning less money, Mrs. Crapsey augmented the family's income by forming the Adelaide T. Crapsey Company. The company began in 1881 as a Sewing-Guild in St. Andrew's Church. The company made "Dainty Smocks and Frocks," for young girls. Their excellent quality attracted the attention of women. Mr. Crapsey bragged that "his wife was an artist who sought perfection."

The Adelaide T. Crapsey Company was "a unique experiment in industry." As a writer in the Christian Statesman wrote, "in slack times, company and employees stand shoulder to shoulder bearing the brunt of them. In good times they share a common prosperity."

Mrs. Crapsey made the factory a pleasant place in which to work and she created a "family atmosphere." The floors were hardwood, the colors were bright, and there were plants and goldfish: all to "a sense of comfort and ease." The seamstresses sat in rocking chairs listened to music while they worked. Hot tea was always available. One of the workers describing the factory said that "the atmosphere was one of a joyful sewing bee with the gentle laughter, the soft creaking of the rocking chairs and the availability of refreshments." The workers did not call themselves employees; they called themselves "the factory family."

The company started out as a charity, producing clothing for poor girls. By 1912, the company was selling its products goods to the B. Forman Co., Rochester's leading department store. The Adelaide T. Crapsey Company was making 100 frocks a day by 1917. In addition to Rochester, the Company sold the children's dresses it produced "all over the United States and in many foreign countries."

On January 27, 1920, the New-York Tribune ran a full page headlined "Visiting Buyers." Under "Infants’ and Children's Wear," was this paragraph:

Frocks for Children—Six months to ten years. Smocked and embroidered

models in flaxon, dimity, chambray, dotted Swiss, English prints and
printed satine. The Adelaide Crapsey Co.

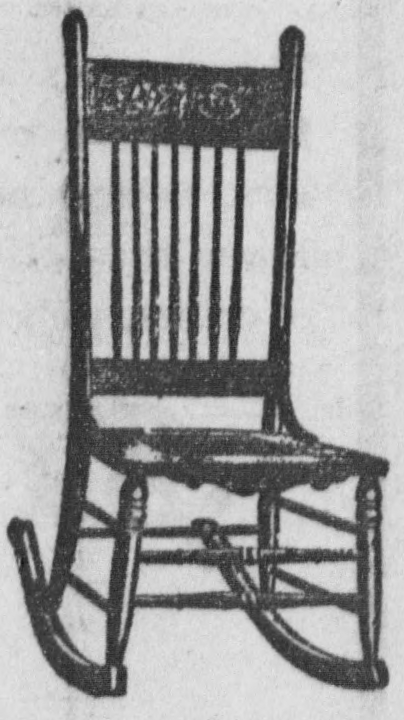
Rocking chair

In 1921, the State of New York Department of Labor and the national magazine Nation's Health commended the Adelaide T. Crapsey Company for designing two things in its factory to minimize worker fatigue caused by poor posture caused by poorly designed equipment. One was a presser's bench, which was used for light pressing work on children's garments, designed for the operator to work with good posture. The other good posture design was for the seamstresses to sit in rocking chairs while they worked. This was in contrast to the "usual bent-double position of the hand worker in a garment factory."

By 1924, the Adelaide T. Crapsey Company employed more than fifty seamstresses and an office staff. The company was pervaded by the "Spirit of the Church and the Brotherhood."

The Company kept going during the first years of the Great Depression, but in 1933 the Company had to close down.

== Public recognition ==
Both of Rochester's newspapers, the morning Democrat and Chronicle and the afternoon Times Union, carried a story with a photograph about Mrs. Crapsey's eightieth birthday on March 7, 1935.

Mrs. Crapsey had a busy day. She answered messages and opened letters and telegrams of congratulation.

Former employees of the Adelaide T. Crapsey Company "were among the first to extend their greetings."

Two of the most appreciated letters came from an elevator man and from some elderly men who lived in the County Hospital. Mrs. Crapsey had visited them every Sunday and holiday until the winter of 1034–1935, when illness prevented her visit. She had also "secured many comforts" for the men.

Representative James P.B. Duffy sent a telegram, saying, "Permit me to join all the people of Rochester in extending to you felicitations on this your 80th birthday. Your life has been an inspiring example and a blessing to us all.".

Mrs. Crapsey told the Democrat and Chronicle reporter "that her only claims to distinction are the facts that she never has had her picture in a newspaper and that she never has been in a bank." On her eightieth birthday, she gave up her first claim to fame. She posed for a newspaper picture.

She told the Times Union reporter that "she was most deeply touched yesterday, she said, by the fact that persons of all religions remembered her."

== Armistice Day, 1941 ==
On Armistice Day 1941, Mrs. Crapsey wrote a letter to the editor of the Courier-Gazette newspaper in Newark, New York, a town about thirty-five miles from Rochester. She enclosed a check to be used to send the paper to men in the armed services from Newark. The letter explained why she cared so much about soldiers: "A very young and beloved Uncle was in the Mexican War and killed in his first battle. My husband was in the Civil War. Two of my Sons were in the Spanish–American War and my youngest Son was in the World War."

On March 7, 1948, the Rochester newspaper the Democrat and Chronicle reported that Mrs. Algernon S. Crapsey was ninety-three, that she had "recently recovered from a hip injury, and that she would "be at home to friends."

== Death ==
The front page of the second section of Rochester's Democrat and Chronicle for Monday, January 9, 1950, contained the following headline:

Mrs. A. S. Crapsey, 94, Rector's Widow, Dies
Was 'Grand Old Lady' To Wide Circle of Friends

The story went on to say that Mrs. Crapsey had died on January 8, 1950, and that her death, after having lived in Rochester for seventy years, marked the end of an era for the city. She was confined to her home because of "a fall in which she suffered a fractured hip. Nevertheless, she kept many friends for whom she was "a grand old lady." The story recounted many of the facts about her life, which have been covered earlier in this article. It also described her as "an accomplished musician." Mrs. Crapsey was survived by five of her nine children.

=== Funeral and burial ===
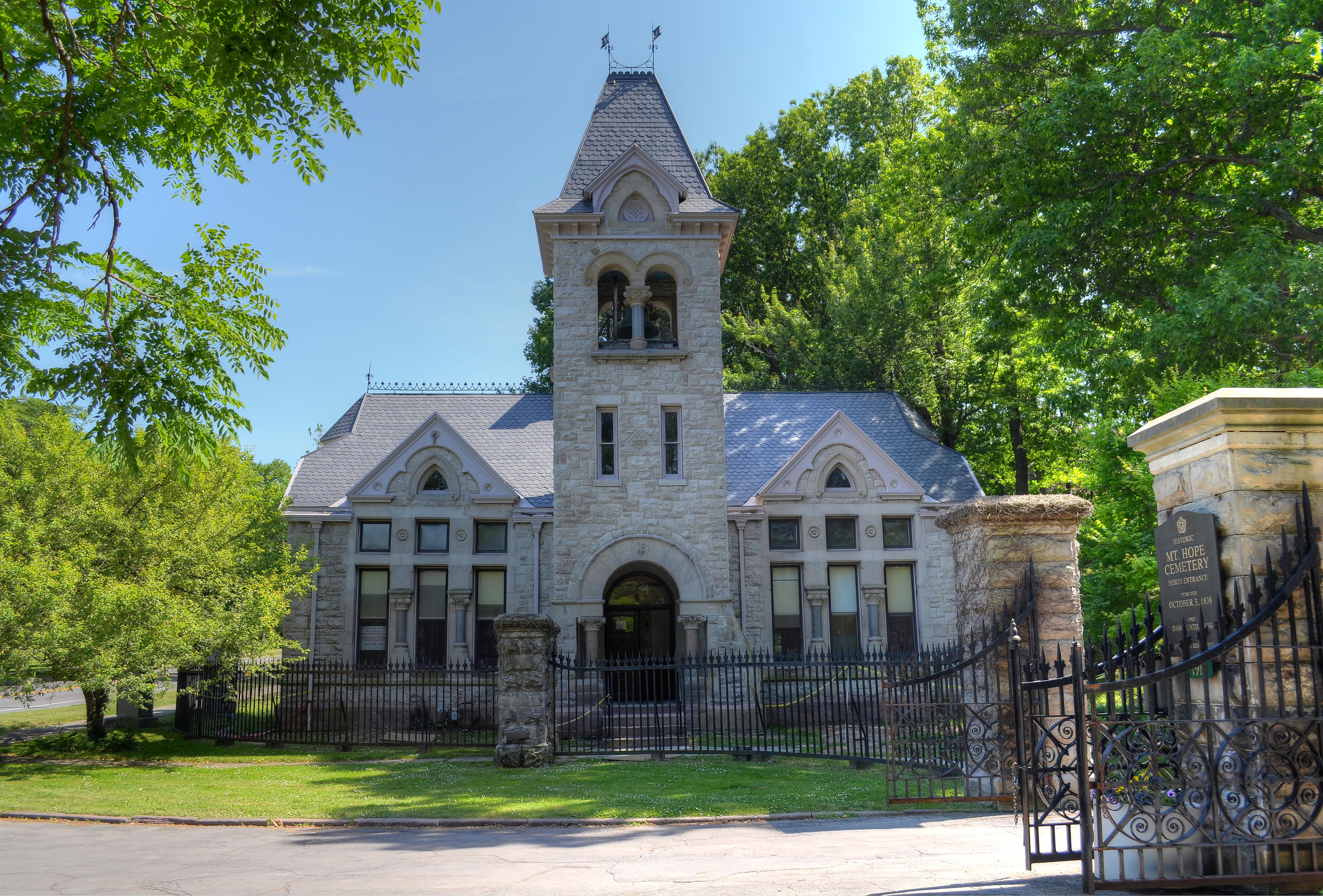
Mount Hope Cemetery Gate House

Mrs. Crapsey's funeral was on January 11, 1950. It was a private service in her home, conducted by the Rector of St. Thomas’ Episcopal Church. The pallbearers were four members of the St, Andrew's Brotherhood.

=== Will ===
Mrs. Crapsey's will placed the papers of her poet daughter Adelaide Crapsey in trust to be sold. The net proceeds of the sales are to be distributed equally to her surviving three sons and two daughters. Family heirlooms were left all of Mrs. Crapsey's surviving descendants and in-laws.
