= Adelaide Crapsey =

American writer

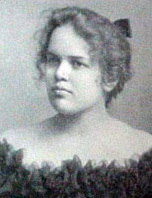
- Adelaide Crapsey
- Born: September 9, 1878; New York City, US
- Died: October 8, 1914 (aged 36); Rochester, New York, US
- Occupation: Poet
- Parent(s): Adelaide T. Crapsey; Algernon Sidney Crapsey

Adelaide Crapsey (September 9, 1878 – October 8, 1914) was an American poet. She was born in Brooklyn, New York, and raised in Rochester, New York. Her parents were the businesswoman Adelaide T. Crapsey and the Episcopal priest Algernon Sidney Crapsey, who moved from New York City to Rochester.

== Early life ==
Crapsey was born on September 9, 1878, in Brooklyn Heights, New York. Her parents were Algernon Sidney Crapsey and Adelaide (Trowbridge) Crapsey. She was their third child, after her brother, Philip, and her sister, Emily. Adelaide was baptized on November 1, 1878, at Trinity Church in New York City, where her father was an assistant minister. Before she was a year old, her father had become the rector of St. Andrew's Episcopal Church in Rochester, New York. His family followed him to Rochester from New York City on the canal boat.

In Rochester, Adelaide attended the public schools.

== Higher education ==
Crapsey was "raised in a liberal environment that encouraged great expectations for women."

After leaving the Rochester public schools, Adelaide with her sister Emily entered Kemper Hall in 1893. Kemper Hall was an Episcopalian woman's college preparatory school in Kenosha, Wisconsin. At Kemper Hall, she took the college preparatory courses which included Latin and French. She was the editor of the school magazine and she played and refereed basketball. She graduated in 1897 as the valedictorian for her class.

Crapsey matriculated in Vassar College in Poughkeepsie, New York, in 1897. She had "a very active four years" in Vassar. For three years she was class poet. She was the editor-in-chief of the Vassarion and managed the basketball team. She was a member of the debating club and was elected to Phi Beta Kappa. She played the role of Lucy the maid in the play The Rivals. Crapsey roomed with Jean Webster who continued to be "her best friend and literary comrade" for the rest of her life.

Two of Adelaide's sisters died while she was in college. Ruth died in 1898 of undulant fever at the age of eleven. Emily, with whom Adelaide was closest, died in 1901 of appendicitis at the age of twenty-four.

Crapsey planned a career in teaching after graduating from Vassar in 1901. However, before beginning work, she took a year off both "to regain her strength" and "to recover from the shock" of Emily's death."

After her year off, Crapsey returned to Kemper Hall to teach history and literature in 1903-1904. While there, she suffered chronic fatigue, which was a symptom of her not-yet-diagnosed tuberculosis. This caused Crapsey to leave her teaching in 1904, to study at the School of Classical Studies of the American Academy in Rome. She supported herself by working occasionally as a lecturer. In Rome, she had a great "rebirth of energy and creativeness" in the warm and temperate Italian climate. While there, she met a man "who reminded her of her reason for living," which she had been seeking. However, the seriousness of her father's situation faced with interviews by the Committee of Investigation of the Diocese of Western New York (his diocese) and possible charges of heresy brought Crapsey back home from Rome in 1905 to support her parents.

One afternoon, when Crapsey and her mother were in the rectory and her father was out, members of the Committee of Investigation came to ask her father some questions. Her mother was "too nervous and worn out from the months in the public eye," so Crapsey offered to serve the men tea. She "spiked the tea with rum," which probably contributed to their good mood when they left. Crapsey's courage in the face of the enemy may have inspired her poem about the biblical Judith:

Israel!
Wake! Be gay!
Thine enemy is brought low—
Thy foe slain—by the hand, by the hand
Of a woman!

In 1906, the Diocese presented charges of heresy against Crapsey's father, and an Ecclesiastical Court was established and trial was set to be held in Batavia, New York. On April 18, 1906, she went with her father and his chief counsel to Batavia. At the end of the trial, her father was found guilty of heresy.

After the trial, Adelaide remained with her family to give them her "support, comfort, and good humor." However, her "literary and academic future" had been suspended for eighteen months. She needed a job near enough to Rochester to be "relatively accessible to her family." She found such a job, teaching history and literature at Miss Low's School in Stamford, Connecticut. Stamford was also only a short train ride from New York City where her father's Court of Appeal was held. The appeal was denied on November 20, 1906.

Crapsey taught at Miss Low's for the academic years 1906-1907 and 1907-1908. With her father's appeal having been denied, he was no longer a minister in the Episcopal Church. He was given until the end of December 1906 to vacate the St. Andrew's rectory. Therefore, when Crapsey went home for Christmas in 1906, the family was moving out of the house in which had been her home for twenty-seven years and into a rented house. When Crapsey went back to Stamford, other sad events followed. Her grandmother Harriet Gunn Trowbridge, whom she had visited as a child, died. In May 1907, her eldest brother Philip died of chronic malaria, which he had contracted during the invasion of Cuba during the Spanish–American War.

Crapsey was not happy teaching at Miss Low's school. The "atmosphere was oppressive" to her; her horizons had expanded. Nevertheless, her teaching was described as "thrilling." Her students "seemed to gravitate" to her classes.

In 1907, Crapsey's father was a delegate to the International Peace Conference at the Hague, and she accompanied him. During the conference, Adelaide, who was fluent in French, was in demand as a translator. The conference was conducted in French and the newspapers were printed in French, a language which few Americans knew. The Crapseys left the conference early "disillusioned and disappointed." After the conference, Adelaide and her father took a walking tour of Wales. Dr. Crapsey was a tireless walker, but Adelaide suffered fatigue. The cause of her fatigue was not diagnosed until 1911 when she was diagnosed with tuberculous meningitis.

After they returned from Europe at the end of the summer of 1907, Adelaide and her father joined the family in their "summer cottage." This gave her a month before she returned to her teaching job at Miss Low's School in Stamford. Crapsey used this time to recuperate and to ponder her future possibilities. As the school year progressed, she became physically weaker. She lacked the energy for activities other than those required of her. Crapsey's weakness probably derived from tuberculosis, although it had not yet been diagnosed. She was so weak that, after a week's teaching, she often spent her weekends in bed to recuperate.

In the summer of 1908, while Crapsey was living with her family in Rochester, she "took helplessly to bed." Because of her poor health, she decided that she must quit her job at Miss Low's School. This left the question of "what would she do?" hanging over her. She was now almost thirty. She was interested in further research on her theory of metrics, but she was not interested in learning the theories of others.

== Further study in Europe ==
To continue her research, in December 1908 she returned to Europe. She lived in Rome, Great Britain, and France. She spent February and March 1908 in the Anglo-American hospital in Rome. Her research was included in a book A Study in English Metrics published in 1918.

In 1911, a combination of health problems and financial issues forced Crapsey to seek employment back in the United States. Smith College in Northampton, Massachusetts, offered her a job teaching Poetics. She accepted it. Later that year, she was diagnosed with tuberculin meningitis. It was also in 1911 that she wrote her first cinquains.

In July 1913, Crapsey collapsed and was admitted sent to a private nursing home in Saranac Lake, New York. In the nursing home, because of her "physical prostration," she was allowed to write only one letter a day. Nevertheless, she managed to write letters and poetry about her condition and her treatment. They contained "flippant humor," possibly as a way of covering the reality that she was at the mercy of a disease for which there was no cure. For example, she wrote a poem she called "Lines Addressed To My Left Lung Inconveniently Enamoured of Plant Life."

It was, my lung, most strange of you,

A freak I cannot pardon,

Thus to transform yourself into

A vegetable garden.

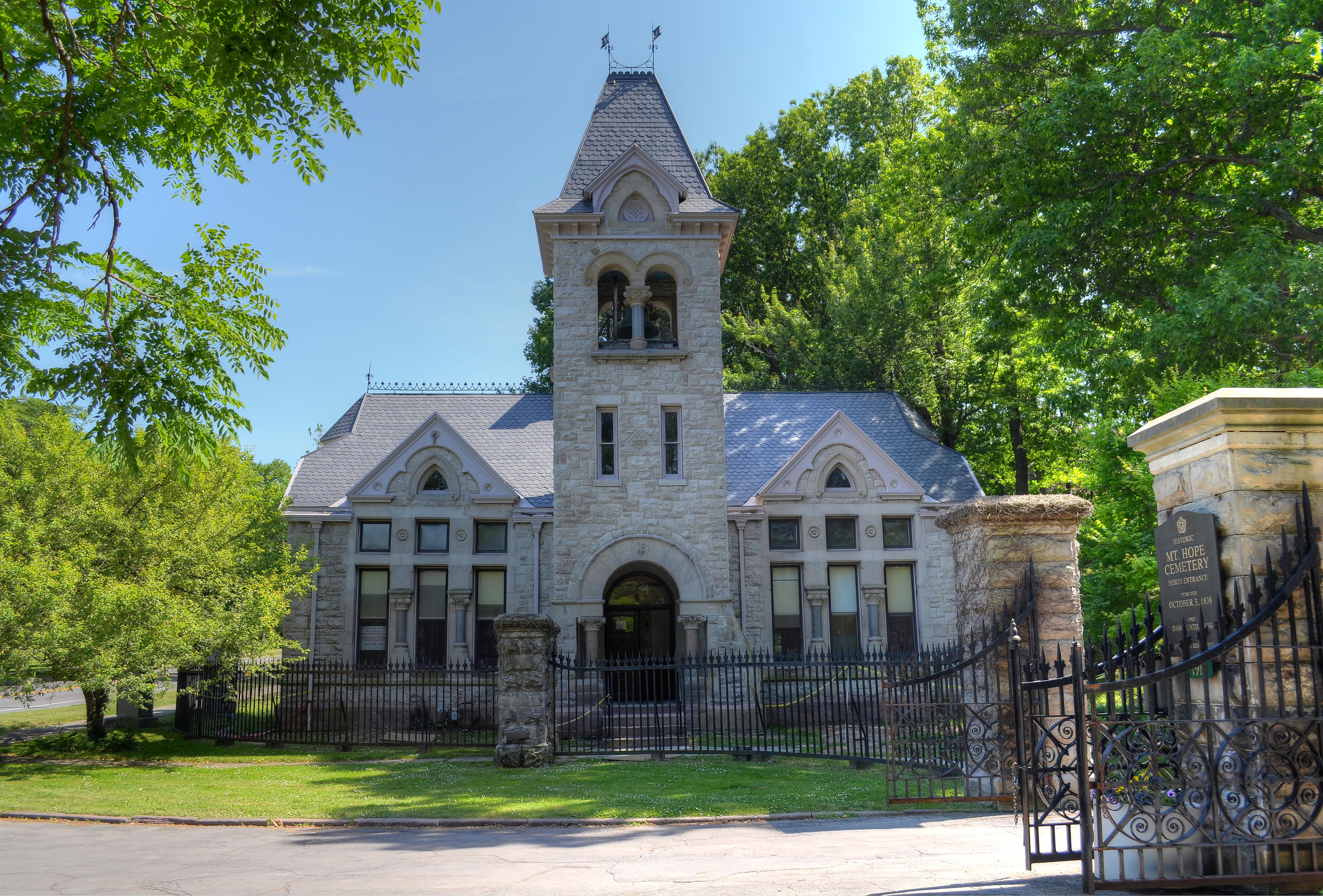
Mount Hope Cemetery Gate House

In August 1914, sicker than ever, Crapsey left the nursing home and returned to her parents' home in Rochester. She died there on October 8, 1914, at the age of thirty-six. As she was dying, she "passed on the torch to her nurse," saying, "Let the story I was not able to tell be told."

== Death and legacy ==
Crapsey's biographer Karen Alkalay-Gut described her life as "constantly hampered by illness, grief, and impecunity." The discrepancy between what she had anticipated doing and what she "actually accomplished was embarrassing to her." The five-line cinquain poetic form she created reflected her life. The first four lines build up "expectancy" only to be followed by a one stress line as an "abbreviated conclusion."

Crapsey's hope for her immortality was in her writings. The envoi of her Verse, entitled "The Immortal Residue," reads:

Wouldst thou find my ashes? Look
In the pages of my book;
And, as these thy hand doth turn,
Know here is my funeral urn.

Claude Bragdon was a friend of the Crapsey family in Rochester. Besides being a noted architect, he had a press. Using his Manus Press, he published a book of Crapsey's poems entitled Verse (Manas Press, 1915). The book has a foreword by Bragdon and a preface by Jean Webster, who was Crapsey's roommate at Vassar and her lifelong friend. In her introduction to Verse, Webster writes that Crapsey was "by nature as vivid and joyous and alive a spirit as ever loved the beauty of life, like Keats and Stevenson, worked doggedly for many years against the numbing weight of a creeping pitiless disease."

Revised editions of Verse were published in 1922 and 1934 and contain earlier unpublished work. Also published posthumously in 1918 was the unfinished A Study in English Metrics, a work she began during her three-year stay in Europe and described in its prefatory note as "a laborious analysis dictated by an acute sense of beauty of verse by an aesthetic experience of unusual intensity."

Crapsey's ashes were buried in the Crapsey family plot in Mount Hope Cemetery. John Rothwell Slater, chairman of the University of Rochester Department of English, wrote these "Lines for Adelaide Crapsey's Grave in Mount Hope":

Here she rests

Who never rested,

Waits for time

That never came.

Here she speaks

For all the silent;

Hers the ashes,

Theirs the flame.

Here lies beauty

Still untold

Here the young

Never grows old.

The poet Carl Sandburg was partly responsible for the continued interest in the cinquain and in keeping Crapsey from obscurity through his poem "Adelaide Crapsey." Crapsey's nephew, Arthur H. Crapsey, became an influential industrial designer in the years following World War II. He is known for a series of iconic camera designs for Eastman Kodak.

Crapsey's papers are in the University of Rochester Library archives.

== Poetic influence ==
In the years immediately before her death, she wrote much of the verse on which her reputation rests. Her interest in rhythm and meter led her to create a unique variation on the cinquain (or quintain), a 5-line form of 22 syllables influenced by the Japanese haiku and tanka. Her five-line cinquain (now styled as an American cinquain) has a generally iambic meter defined as "one-stress, two-stress, three-stress, four-stress and suddenly back to one-stress" and normally consists of 2 syllables in the first and last lines and 4, 6 and 8 syllables in the middle three lines, as shown in the poem Niagara. Marianne Moore said of her poetic style, "Crapsey's apartness and delicately differentiated footfalls, her pallor and color were impressive."

== Works ==
=== Poetry ===
- A study in English metrics. A.A. Knopf. 1918. "Adelaide Crapsey."
- Verse. A. A. Knopf. 1922. "Adelaide Crapsey."
- Sutton Smith, Susan:The complete poems and collected letters of Adelaide Crapsey State University of New York Press, Albany 1977 ISBN 0-87395-342-8

The text of Verse is available on Project Gutenberg.

=== Anthologies ===
- Marjorie Barrows; Adelaide Crapsey; Emily Dickinson; Louise Imogen Guiney; Ella Higginson; Sarah Orne Jewett; Emma Lazarus; Agnes Lee; Katherine Mansfield; Lizette Woodworth Reese; Harriet Beecher Stowe (1947). Marjorie Barrows (ed.). One Thousand Beautiful Things. Peoples Book Club.

American Poetry, The Twentieth Century, Volume One, The Library of America, 2000.

=== Short stories ===
- "A girl to love". The Vassar Miscellany. 27 (2). Vassar College. 1897.
- "The knowledge he gained". The Vassar Miscellany. Vassar College. 1898.

=== Songs ===
- George Antheil (1934). Five Songs, 1919–1920, for Soprano and Piano: After Adelaide Crapsey. Cos Cob Press. (reprint Publisher Boosey & Hawkes, 1986)
- Hugo Weisgall (1940). Four Songs, op. 1, for High or Medium Voice and Piano. Maxwell Weaner. (reprint publisher Theodore Presser)
- Ben Weber (1957). Five Songs, op. 15, for Soprano and Piano (1941). American Composers Alliance.
- Harrison Kerr (1952). Six Songs to Poems by Adelaide Crapsey. Edward B. Marks Music Corporation.
- William Alexander (1986). Cinquains: For Soprano Voice, Clarinet, Cello, and Piano : (1980).
- Paul Moravec. Evensong: Song Cycle for Tenor and Piano. 1992.
- Alex Weiser (2021). Above the Bulk of Crashing Water: Five Cinquains of Adelaide Crapsey for Mezzo Soprano and Piano
