= South Wedge Historic District =

Historic district in New York, United States

- U.S. National Register of Historic Places
- U.S. Historic district
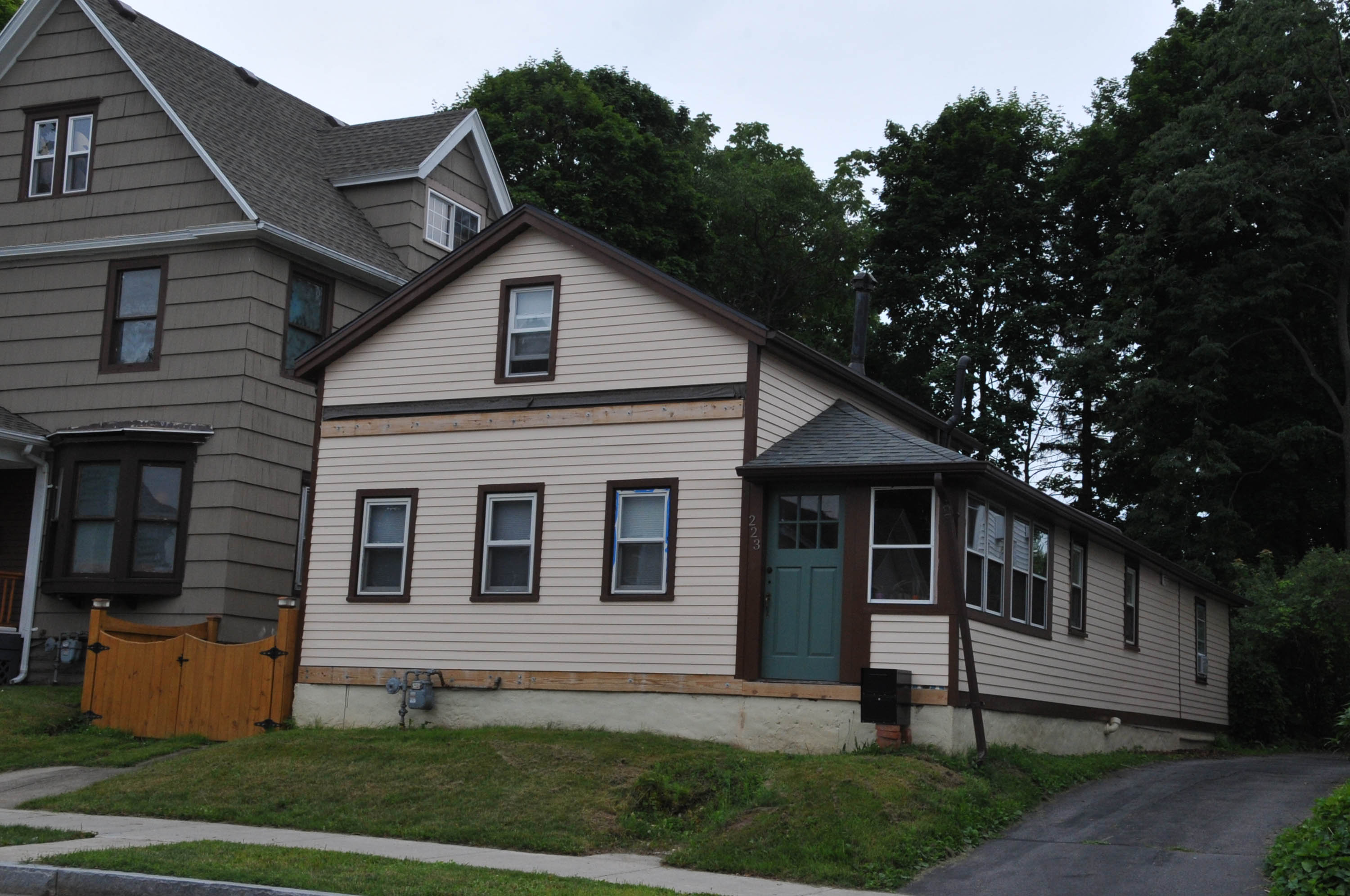
- South Wedge Historic District, January 2008

- Location within New York Location within the United States
- Location: 20-98 Alexander, 20-123 Ashland, 39-336 Averill, 14-89 Bond, 38-149 Comfort, 1-396 Gregory, 59-279 Hamilton Sts., Rochester, New York
- Coordinates: 43°08′36″N 77°36′14″W
- Area: 77.69 acres (31.44 ha)
- Built: c. 1840-1930
- Architectural style: Italianate, Queen Anne
- NRHP reference No.: 13000307
- Added to NRHP: May 22, 2013

South Wedge is a historic district and neighborhood in southeast Rochester, New York, in a predominantly residential section of the city. The district includes a variety of buildings constructed between the 1840s and 1920s, mainly two-story detached family residences. The architecture is primarily vernacular with a few examples of high-style Italianate and Queen Anne style residences, and the separately listed Saint Andrew's Episcopal Church and Nazareth House. Other notable buildings include St. Boniface Church, School 13, School 28, and Engine Company No. 8.

It was listed on the National Register of Historic Places in 2013.
