= Nazareth House =

- U.S. National Register of Historic Places
- U.S. Historic district – Contributing property
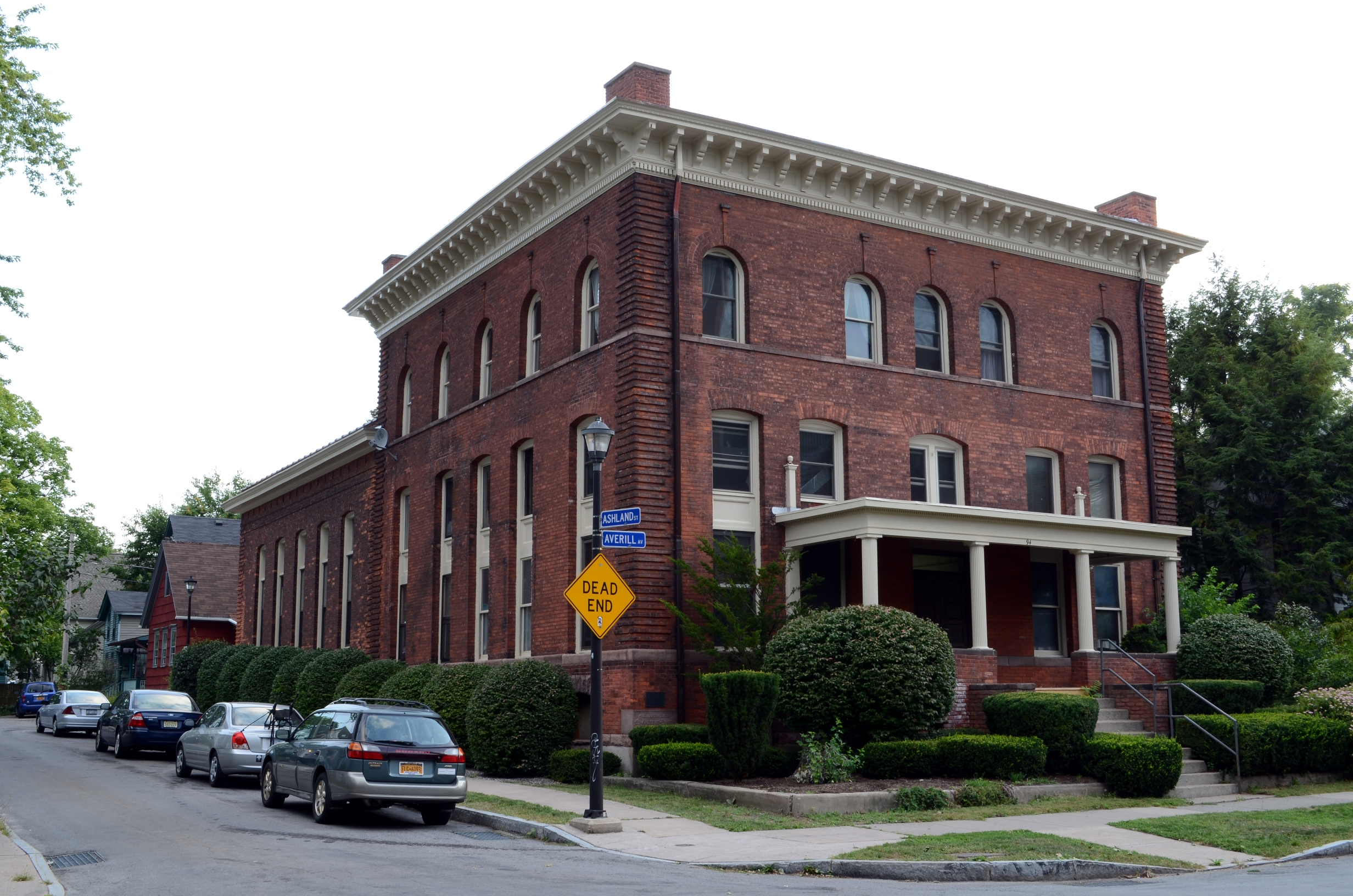
- Nazareth House, September 2012

- Location within New York Location within the United States
- Location: 94 Averill Ave., Rochester, New York
- Coordinates: 43°8′39″N 77°36′35″W
- Area: less than one acre
- Built: 1893
- Architect: Walker & Nichols
- Architectural style: Neo-Renaissance
- NRHP reference No.: 84002734
- Added to NRHP: April 12, 1984

Nazareth House, also known as St. Andrew's Parish House, is a historic building in Rochester, Monroe County, New York, United States. It is a three-story, brick institutional building built in 1893 and enlarged in 1911. The original section is a three-story, five-bay, red brick structure in the Neoclassical style. The building was once used for social and education services, but was renovated in the early 1980s into six apartments.

It was listed on the National Register of Historic Places in 1984. It is located in the South Wedge Historic District.
