= Karen Alkalay-Gut =

Israeli poet, professor, and editor

- קרן אלקלעי-גוט
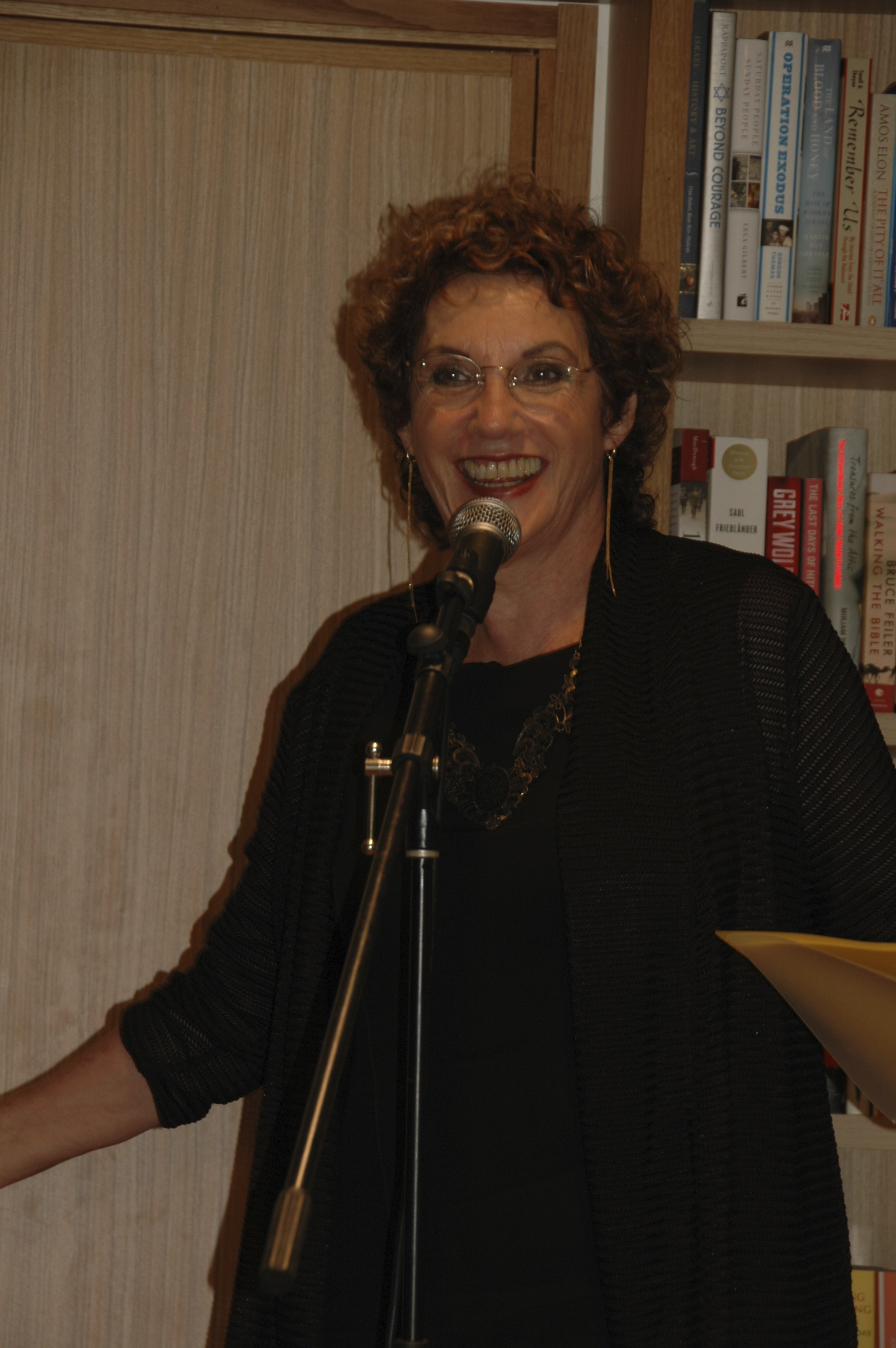
- Born: 29 March 1945 (age 81); London, UK
- Education: University of Rochester
- Occupations: Poet; professor; editor

Karen Alkalay-Gut (Hebrew: קרן אלקלעי-גוט; born 29 March 1945) is a poet, professor, and editor who lives in Israel and writes in English.

== Personal life ==
Alkalay-Gut was born in London. She moved with her parents and brother Joseph Rosenstein to Rochester, New York in 1948. Alkalay-Gut graduated from the University of Rochester, with a BA with honors, and an MA in English literature in 1967.

From 1967 to 1970 she taught at the State University of New York at Geneseo before returning to complete her doctorate.

In 1972 she immigrated to Israel.

She taught at the Ben Gurion University of the Negev from 1972 to 1976. In 1977, Alkalay-Gut began working at Tel Aviv University, where she continued to teach.

She is married to Ezra Gut.

== Work ==
In 1980 her first collection, Making Love: Poems appeared with the aid and editorial assistance of poet David Avidan, and she has published over twenty books since. Her poetry has also appeared in Hebrew, French, Arabic, Yiddish, Rumanian, Polish, Russian, German, Turkish, Persian and Italian. Her concern with multimedia has brought about collaborations with fashion houses such as Comme il faut, as well as sculpture, graffiti, ceremonies. Her translations of Hebrew poetry such Yehuda Amichai and Rony Sommek have numbered in the hundreds.

As a critic, Alkalay-Gut is the author of a biography of Adelaide Crapsey as well as numerous articles on Victorian and contemporary literature. She has participated in numerous anthologies, encyclopedias and edited volumes. She has also translated poetry and drama from Hebrew and other languages, including Yehuda Amichai, Raquel Chalfi, and Hanoch Levin. In 1980, Alkalay-Gut helped found the Israel Association of Writers in English, and functioned as chair from 1995 to 2015. She returned to chair in 2018. She also served as vice-chair of the Federation of Writers' Unions, and as an editor of the Jerusalem Review.

Alkalay-Gut has appeared in venues such as the Library of Congress and Kennedy Center in Washington, D.C., the U.N. and the Yale Club of New York City, The Einav Center, Beit Avihai, the Willy Brandt Center, Mishkenot Shaananim and the Writers House in Israel, as well as many universities, churches, synagogues and nightclub around the world.

Alkalay-Gut was awarded the Rubinlicht Prize (2019) for her contribution to Yiddish Literature. In 2018 she was listed by the Jewish Agency for Israel as number 24 of one hundred Jews who moved from Britain to help shape the modern state of Israel. Among her previous awards are the Jewish Agency Award in 1994, and first in the BBC World Service Poetry Award (1990).

== Works ==
- Alone in the Dawn: The Life of Adelaide Crapsey. Athens: University of Georgia Press, December 1988.

=== Poetry ===
Books in English

- Making Love: Poems. Tel Aviv: Achshav, 1980
- Mechitza. New York: Cross-Cultural Communications, 1986
- Ignorant Armies. Tel Aviv: Tentative Press, 1992
- Between Bombardments. Tel Aviv: Tentative Press, 1992
- Love Soup. Tel Aviv: Tentative Press, 1992
- High School Girls. Tel Aviv: Tentative Press, 1992
- Recipes. Tel Aviv: Golan, 1994 Harmonies/ Disharmonies. Etc. Editions, 1994
- Ignorant Armies. New York: Cross Cultural Communications, 1994
- Life in Israel—November 1995–1996. Whistle Press, 1997.
- In My Skin, Sivan, 2000.
- High Maintenance, Ride the Wind Press, 2001
- So Far So Good. Boulevard, 2004.
- Danza del ventre a tel aviv. Kololbris, 2010.
- Layers. Simple Conundrums, 2012.
- Avra Cadivra. Amazon, 2013.
- Hanging Around the House. Simple Conundrums, 2017.
- A Word in Edgewise. Simple Conundrums, 2020.
- Inheritance, Leyvick Press, 2021.
- Egypt: An Israelite Returns. Simple Conundrums, 2021.
- Survivors. Amazon, 2025

Books in Hebrew:

- Pislei Chema. Kibbutx Hameuchad. 1983.
- Butter Sculptures (Hebrew). Tel Aviv: Ha kibbutz Hameuchad, 1983.
- Ata, Ani, veod Shirei Milchama. Kibbutx Hameuchad, 1989.
- HaAltivi Behayei Yomyom.. Gvanim, 1990.
- I/Thou and Other War Poems. Tel Aviv: Hakibbutz Hameuchad,1994
- Paranormal Poems. Gvanim, 1997
- Ahavat Begadim ve Erom. Kibbutz Hameuchad, 1999.
- Ta'avot Shuliot. Kibbutz Hameuchad, 2004.
- Shomrei Neurei. Keshev, 2011.
- Nisim vechulei. Keshev, 2012.
- Drachim le'ehov Keshev, 2018.
- Shirim Tluim Ekked, 2023.
- Kurt Gerron, simple conundrums, 2024
- Po Nitman Hameshorer, Ktav, 2025

Books in Yiddish:

- Yerusha. Beit Leyvick, 2018.

Book in Italian:

- Danza del ventre a Tel Aviv, Kolibris, 2010.

Book in French

- Survivre a son histoire, (translation: Sabine Huynh) Corlevour, 2020.

Book in Danish

- Rum & krop: Digte fra Israel (translation: Flemming Ravn) Ravns Bureau, 2020.

Discography:

- The Paranormal in Our Daily Lives. Poems: Karen Alkalay-Gut; Piano: Liz Magne; Recording, Mix – Ziv Yonatan. 1999.
- Thin Lips – Thin Lips. Poems: Karen Alkalay-Gut; Piano: Roy Yarkoni; Bass: Yishai Sommer. Pookh Records, 2004.
- Panic Ensemble – Love Soup. A DVD release, 2008.
- Panic Ensemble – Jewish Women. Earsay Records, 2008
- Panic Ensemble – Panic Ensemble, Earsay Records, 2008.
- Panic Ensemble – A Different Story, Nana Disc LTD, 2012.
- Danza del ventre a Tel Aviv [Belly Dancing in Tel Aviv]: Poesie d'amore e sopravivenza [Poems of Love and Survival] [Unabridged] [Audible Audio Edition], Quondom,2012.

== See also ==
- Ada Aharoni
- Raquel Chalfi
- Hava Pinchas-Cohen
- Janice Rebibo
- Naomi Shemer
- Yona Wallach
- Zelda (poet)
