= Compagnie des Tabacs Comme Il Faut, S.A. =

Tobacco company

- Type: Private
- Industry: Tobacco industry
- Founded: 1927
- Headquarters: Port-au-Prince, Haiti
- Key people: Rick Hicks (President)
- Products: Cigarettes
- Website: commeilfaut2.com

Compagnie des Tabacs Comme Il Faut, S.A. is an international tobacco company based in Port-au-Prince, Haiti. It is owned by Luckett, Inc. of Louisville, KY and is the only cigarette maker in Haiti with its Comme Il Faut and Point brands marketed locally.

== History ==
Comme Il Faut was founded in 1927. Thanks to a US$10M investment, the company raised its production capacity to 20,000 kilos of tobacco per day. In 2008 the company launched a lower-priced cigarette named Point on the Haitian market.

== Activities ==
Comme Il Faut manufactures the Comme Il Faut and Point cigarette brands. The tobacco company is best known for producing customized private label brands for its partners worldwide.
