= Saint Andrew's Episcopal Church (Rochester, New York) =

Historic church in New York, United States

- U.S. National Register of Historic Places
- U.S. Historic district – Contributing property
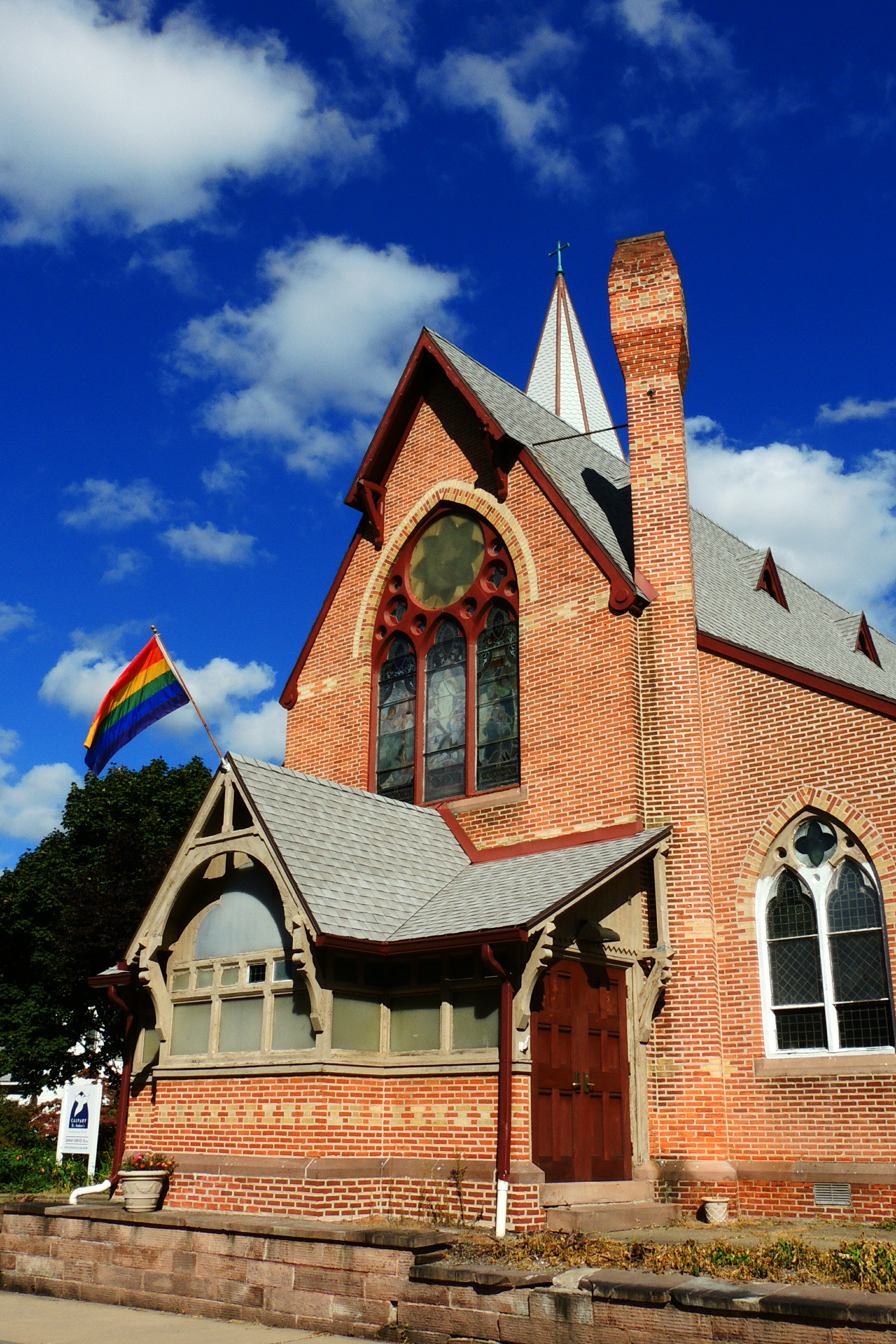
- The church in 2013

- Location within New York Location within the United States
- Location: 95 Averill Ave., Rochester, New York
- Coordinates: 43°8′44″N 77°36′30″W
- Area: 0.7 acres (0.28 ha)
- Built: 1873
- Architect: Upjohn, Richard M.
- Architectural style: Gothic
- NRHP reference No.: 06000886
- Added to NRHP: September 28, 2006

Saint Andrew's Episcopal Church, also known as Calvary-Saint Andrew's Presbyterian Church, is a historic Episcopal church complex located at Rochester in Monroe County, New York. Designed by Richard M. Upjohn, it was constructed in phases between 1873 and 1880. The Gothic Revival style brick and stone complex consists of two interconnected sections: the church, composed of the church, bell tower, and entry porch, and the original rectory and chapel. The high altar and window were designed by George Hausshalter. The window was made by the Tiffany studios of New York. In 1968, the Saint Andrew's Episcopal Church merged with Calvary Presbyterian Church to form Calvary St. Andrews, a Presbyterian parish.

It was listed on the National Register of Historic Places in 2006. It is located in the South Wedge Historic District.
