= Michaels–Stern Building =

Historic commercial building in New York, United States

- U.S. National Register of Historic Places
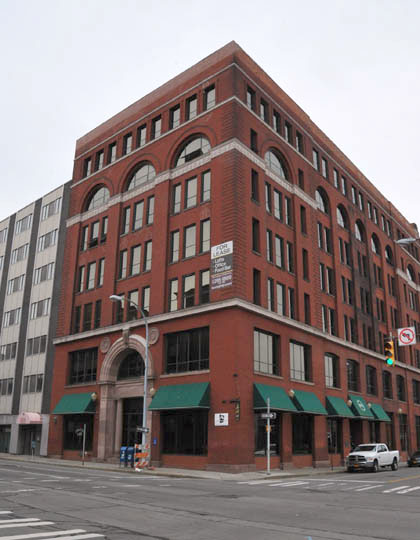

- Location within New York Location within the United States
- Location: 87 N. Clinton Ave., Rochester, New York
- Coordinates: 43°9′31″N 77°36′28″W
- Area: less than one acre
- Built: 1893
- Architect: Nolan, Nolan & Stern
- Architectural style: Beaux Arts
- MPS: Inner Loop MRA
- NRHP reference No.: 85002854
- Added to NRHP: October 04, 1985

The Michaels–Stern Building is a historic industrial and commercial building located at 87 North Clinton Avenue in Rochester, Monroe County, New York.

== Description and history ==
It is a seven-story, rectangular brick structure with Beaux Arts details. It was built in 1893 for Michaels, Stern, and Company, a manufacturer of ready-to-wear apparel. The building served as manufacturing, office, wholesale and retail functions for the firm until they closed in 1977.

It was listed on the National Register of Historic Places in 1985.
