= Michaels, Stern, and Company =

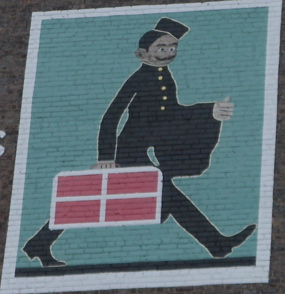
Michaels, Stern, & Co. mural

Michaels, Stern, and Co. was a Rochester-based manufacturer of men's tailored suits and apparel. The company was founded in 1849 by Henry Michaels (1822–1894). After several name changes and changes in partnership, the company became known as Michaels-Stern & Co. when Henry Michael's son-in-law Morley A. Stern joined as a partner in 1877. The company was liquidated in 1977.

The company was one of several Rochester-based men's clothing companies. Some of the other companies included Fashion Park, Inc, Superba Cravats, and Hickey Freeman. Today, only Hickey Freeman remains of the original Rochester-based men's clothing companies, although Hickey Freeman is now owned by Grano Retail Investments Inc

In 1893, a seven-story company building was erected. Beginning around 1984, while under bankruptcy protection, the Michaels–Stern Building was rented to tenants, including "artists, photographers, rock groups, dance studios, fencing and karate clubs". The Lofts at Michaels/Stern are currently rented as residential apartments.
