= Sarah Blaisdell Dorn =

American businesswoman (1927–2016)

- Born: Sarah Barcroft Blaisdell; 19 August 1927; Bradford, Pennsylvania, US
- Died: 11 January 2016 (aged 88); Bradford, Pennsylvania, US
- Other name: Sarah B. Dorn
- Education: Bradford High School; Katharine Gibbs Business Academy
- Occupations: Businesswoman; Philanthropist; Teacher
- Years active: 1978–2016
- Spouse: Richard B. Dorn (m. 1981; death 2016)
- Children: 2
- Parent: George Grant Blaisdell (father)
- Relatives: Harriett Blaisdell (sister); Brett Madden (granddaughter)

Sarah Blaisdell Dorn (August 19, 1927 – January 11, 2016) was an American heiress, businesswoman and philanthropist from Bradford, Pennsylvania. She was a long-time co-owner, vice president, and treasurer of Zippo Manufacturing Company, the company known globally for producing the Zippo lighter.

== Early life and education ==
Sarah Blaisdell was born in Bradford, Pennsylvania, to George Grant Blaisdell, the founder of Zippo Manufacturing Company, and Miriam Barcroft Blaisdell.

She completed her secondary education locally, graduating from Bradford High School in 1945. She then pursued higher education, earning a Bachelor of Arts degree from Connecticut College. Furthering her business acumen, she graduated from the Katharine Gibbs Business Academy in New York City.

== Career ==
After her father's death in 1978, Sarah Dorn and her sister, Harriett B. Wick, inherited Zippo Manufacturing Company. She assumed leadership roles within the company, including serving as Vice President and Treasurer. She remained actively involved in the company's operations and strategic direction for many years. Her son, George B. Duke, eventually succeeded her as the sole family owner and chairman of the board.

=== Philanthropy and community involvement ===
Dorn was highly regarded for her extensive philanthropic work, particularly in the Bradford region. Her charitable efforts, often conducted through the Blaisdell Foundation, focused heavily on education, healthcare, and local community development.

She along with her younger sister Harriett, she established the Miriam Barcroft Blaisdell Scholarship, which has provided financial assistance to thousands of students. For their significant contributions, the university awarded both sisters the Presidential Medal of Freedom in 1993, the university's highest honor.

She established the Bradford Hospital Foundation and Dorn was a significant benefactor to the local hospital. The foundation established the annual "SARAH Award" in her honor to recognize outstanding community service. She supported the McKean County SPCA and quietly helped high school classmates who couldn't afford yearbooks as a girl.

== Personal life ==
Sarah Blaisdell Dorn was married to Richard B. Dorn and had two sons, George B. Duke and Paul C. Duke III. Brett Madden an actress and voice actress is her granddaughter.

== Death ==
She died at her home in Bradford, Pennsylvania, on January 11, 2016, at the age of 88.

== Honours ==
In 2010, the university named a new residence hall, the Sarah B. Dorn House (Dorn House), in her honor. The three-story building houses up to 100 students in suite-style apartments. A formal dedication ceremony was held on September 10, 2010.

The Blaisdell family was inducted into the University of Pittsburgh's Cathedral of Learning Society in 2005. The Harriett B. Wick Chapel, named for her sister, features the Sarah B. Dorn Organ.

== Awards and recognition ==
Year	Award	Category	Result	Title	Ref.
1993	Pitt-Bradford	Presidential Medal of Freedom	Won	Philanthropy	
