= Harriett Blaisdell =

American businesswoman (born 1924)

- Born: Harriett Barcroft Blaisdell; September 27, 1924 (age 102); Bradford, Pennsylvania, US
- Other names: Harriett Blaisdell Wick; Harriett B. Wick; Harriet Blaisdell
- Education: Bradford High School; Connecticut College
- Alma mater: Katherine Gibbs Business Academy
- Occupations: Businesswoman; Philanthropist; Teacher
- Years active: 1978 – present
- Spouse: Robert Wick (m. 1942; died 1997)
- Children: 2
- Parent: George G. Blaisdell (father)
- Relatives: Sarah Blaisdell Dorn (sister); Brett Madden (granddaughter)

Harriett Blaisdell (born 27 September 1924) is an American heiress, businesswoman, teacher and philanthropist. She is a daughter of George G. Blaisdell, the founder of Zippo Manufacturing Company, and a significant benefactor to educational and community causes in Bradford, Pennsylvania.

== Early life and education ==
Harriett Blaisdell was born in September 1924 to George G. Blaisdell and Miriam Barcroft Blaisdell. She grew up in Bradford, Pennsylvania, where her father founded Zippo Manufacturing Company in the early 1930s. She graduated from Bradford High School in 1945. She pursued higher education, earning a Bachelor of Arts degree from Connecticut College, followed by a diploma from the Katharine Gibbs Business Academy in New York City.

== Career and Zippo Manufacturing Company ==
Wick, along with her sister Sarah B. Dorn, grew up around the family business and was involved in Zippo operations for years. Upon the death of her father in 1978, ownership of the privately held Zippo Manufacturing Company passed to Harriett Wick and Sarah Dorn. They both served on the company's board of directors. While they did not wish to run the company's daily operations, they maintained ownership through the 1980s and 1990s as the business expanded its global reach and appealed to collectors. Eventually, the Wick family's shares were acquired by the Dorn family branch, with her nephew, George B. Duke, becoming the sole family owner and chairman of the board.

=== Philanthropy and community service ===
Harriett is a notable benefactor to civic and educational institutions in the Bradford area. A large portion of her philanthropy has been directed toward the University of Pittsburgh at Bradford (Pitt-Bradford). Through the Blaisdell Foundation, which was established by her father in 1950, Wick helped establish scholarship funds, including the Miriam Barcroft Blaisdell Scholarship, which supports 65 students annually. In 1995, she and other family members provided a significant $1.5 million challenge gift that facilitated the construction of Blaisdell Hall on campus. Harriett and her sister established scholarship funds in honor of their mother, Miriam Barcroft Blaisdell.

The Harriett B. Wick Chapel was made in her honor. The beautiful non-denominational chapel on the Pitt-Bradford campus was named and dedicated in her honor in 2010, recognizing her long-standing support and contributions to the university. Like her sister, Harriett has served on the boards of multiple charitable organizations supporting health, welfare, social, and leisure programs around Bradford.

In recognition of her community work and philanthropy, she received the Presidential Medal of Freedom from Pitt-Bradford in 1993 and was inducted into the University of Pittsburgh's prestigious Cathedral of Learning Society in 2005.

== Personal life ==
Harriett Blaisdell was married to Robert Wick. They have two children, D. Blaise Wick and Barbara Wick Kearney. Her husband, Robert H. Wick, was also involved with the university, serving on its advisory board. She lives in the Bradford area and celebrated her 100th birthday on September 27, 2024. Brett Madden an actress and voice actress is her granddaughter.

== Honours ==
The chapel at the University of Pittsburgh at Bradford is named in her honor. The chapel is a non-denominational space used for quiet reflection, weddings, musical performances, and other events.

== Awards and recognition ==
Year	Award	Category	Result	Title	Ref.
1993	Pitt-Bradford	Presidential Medal of Freedom	Won	Philanthropy	
