= Novelty lighter =

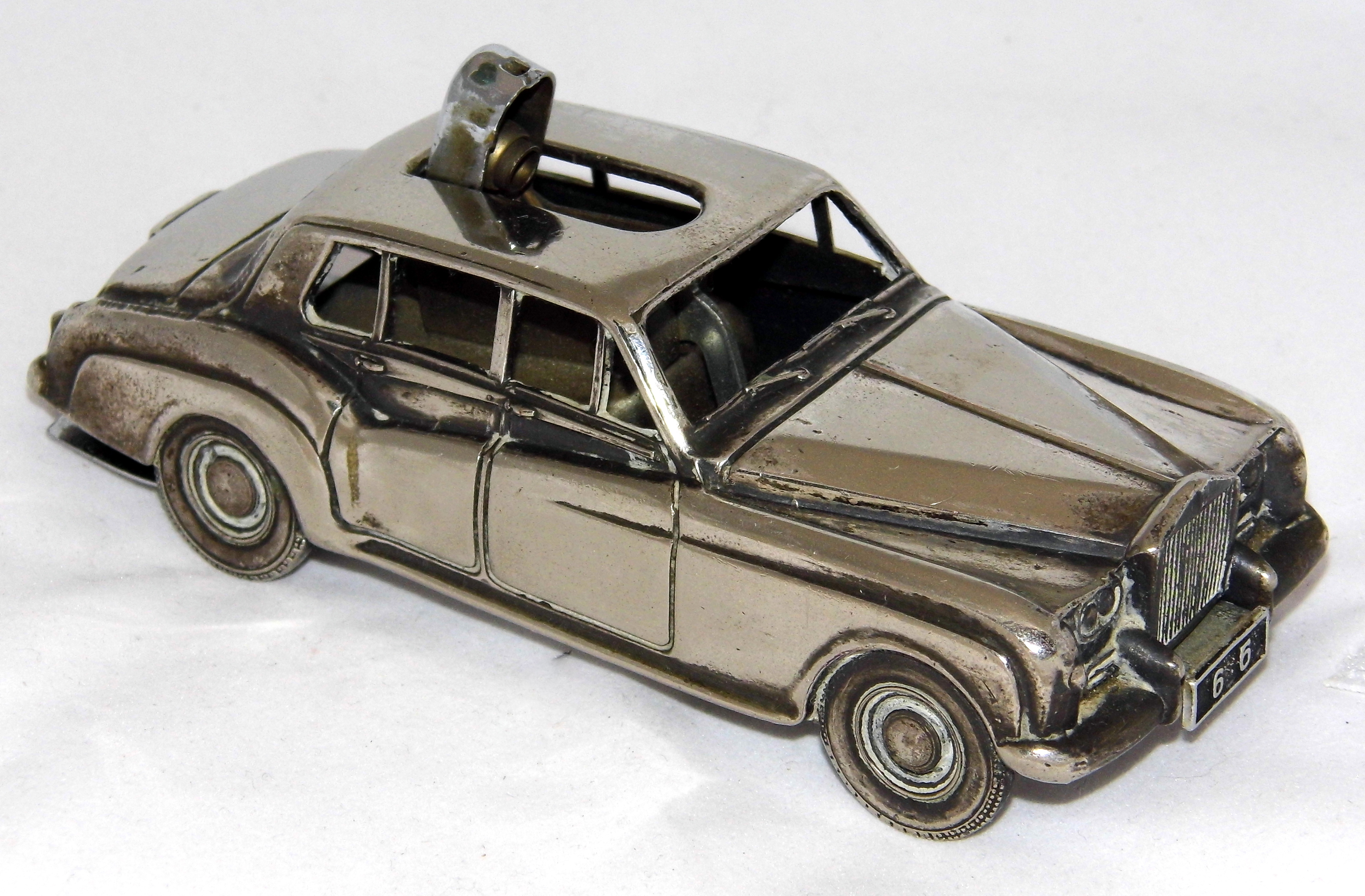
Vintage Rolls-Royce Silver Plated Cigarette Lighter

A novelty lighter is a lighter that is shaped like another object. Novelty lighters can have audio or visual effects, and may look like toys. They are typically used to light tobacco products.

== Bans on novelty lighters ==
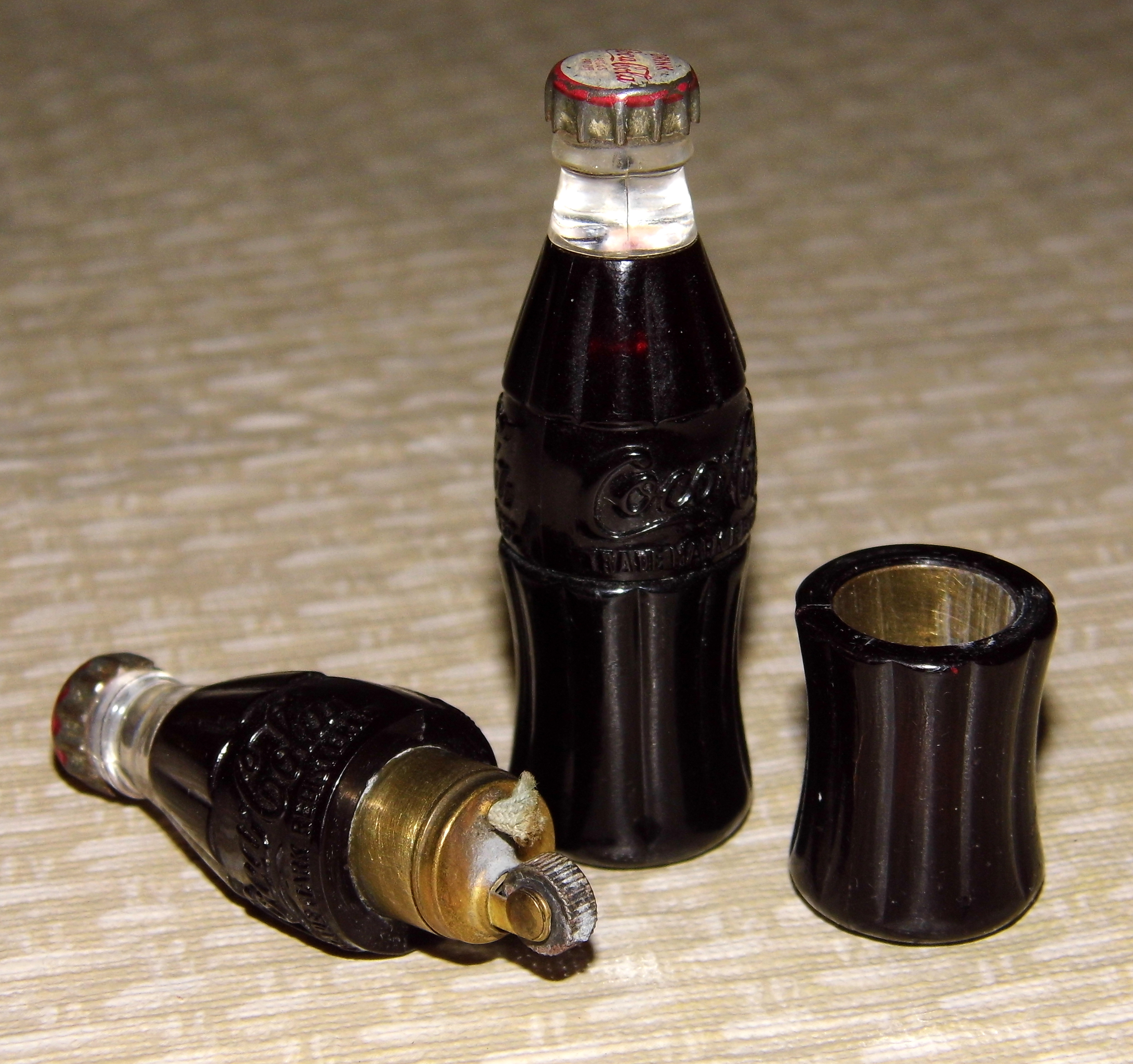
Pair of Vintage Coca-Cola Cigarette Lighters - such a design could nowadays be prohibited in Europe

On May 11, 2006, the European Consumer Protection Commission adopted a decision requiring Member States to ensure that, from March 11, 2007, cigarette lighters are child-resistant when placed on the EU market. The decision also prohibits placing lighters on the market that resemble objects that are particularly attractive to children.

In the United States, Maine was the first state to ban the sale of novelty lighters. This ban came about after the son of a Maine fire chief singed his eyebrow on a novelty lighter shaped like a baseball bat. Since then, Illinois, Virginia, Tennessee, Oregon, Massachusetts, Arkansas, and Washington have also banned novelty lighters.

U.S. Senators Chris Dodd (D-Conn.), Ron Wyden (D-Ore.), and Susan Collins (R-Maine) introduced the “Protect Children from Dangerous Lighters Act” in 2008, which would ban these lighters nationally. It did not become law.

Novelty lighters were banned from sale and manufacture in South Australia on 6 January 2010.

== Gallery ==
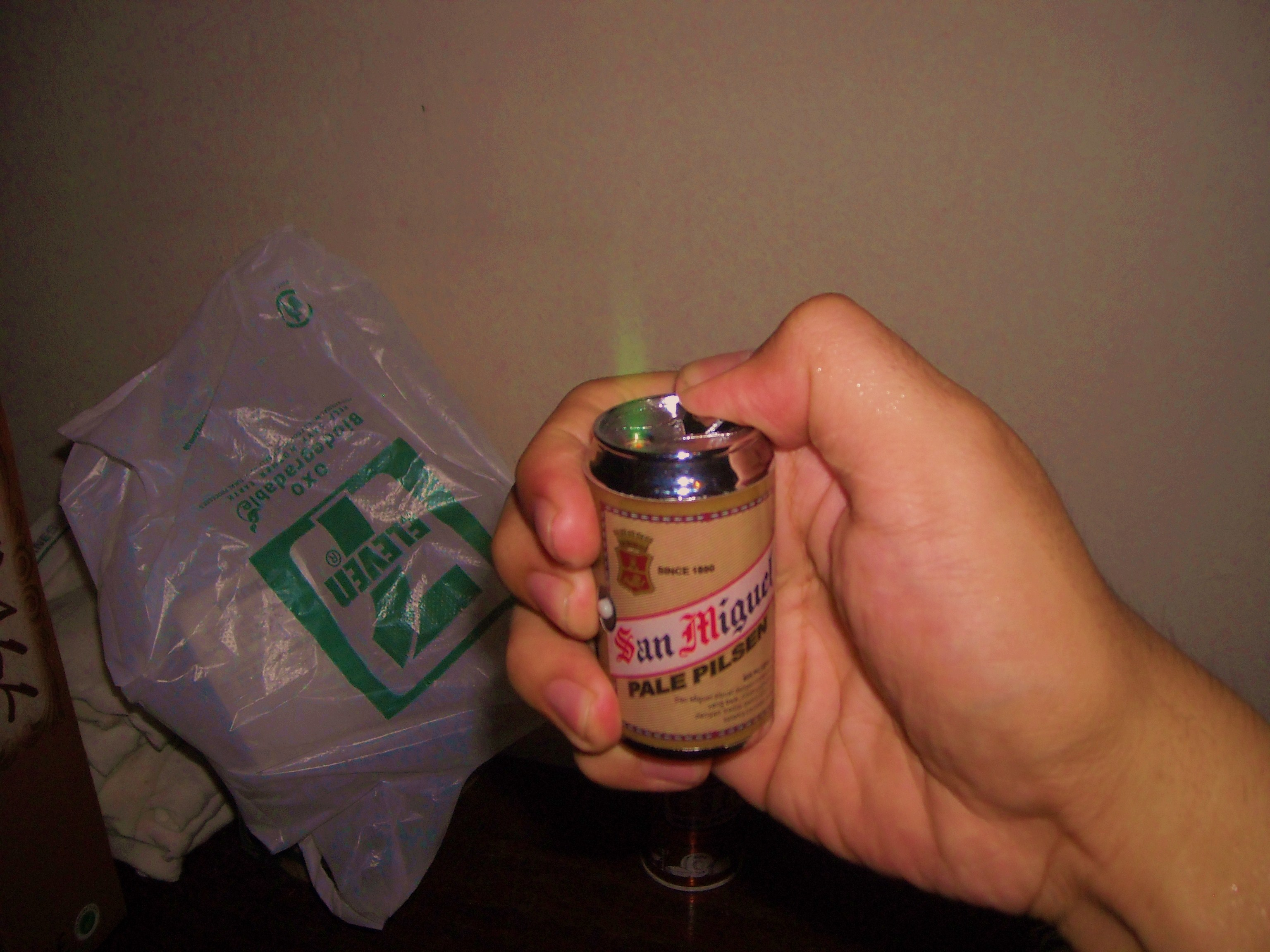
A lighter shaped like a beer can, producing green flame

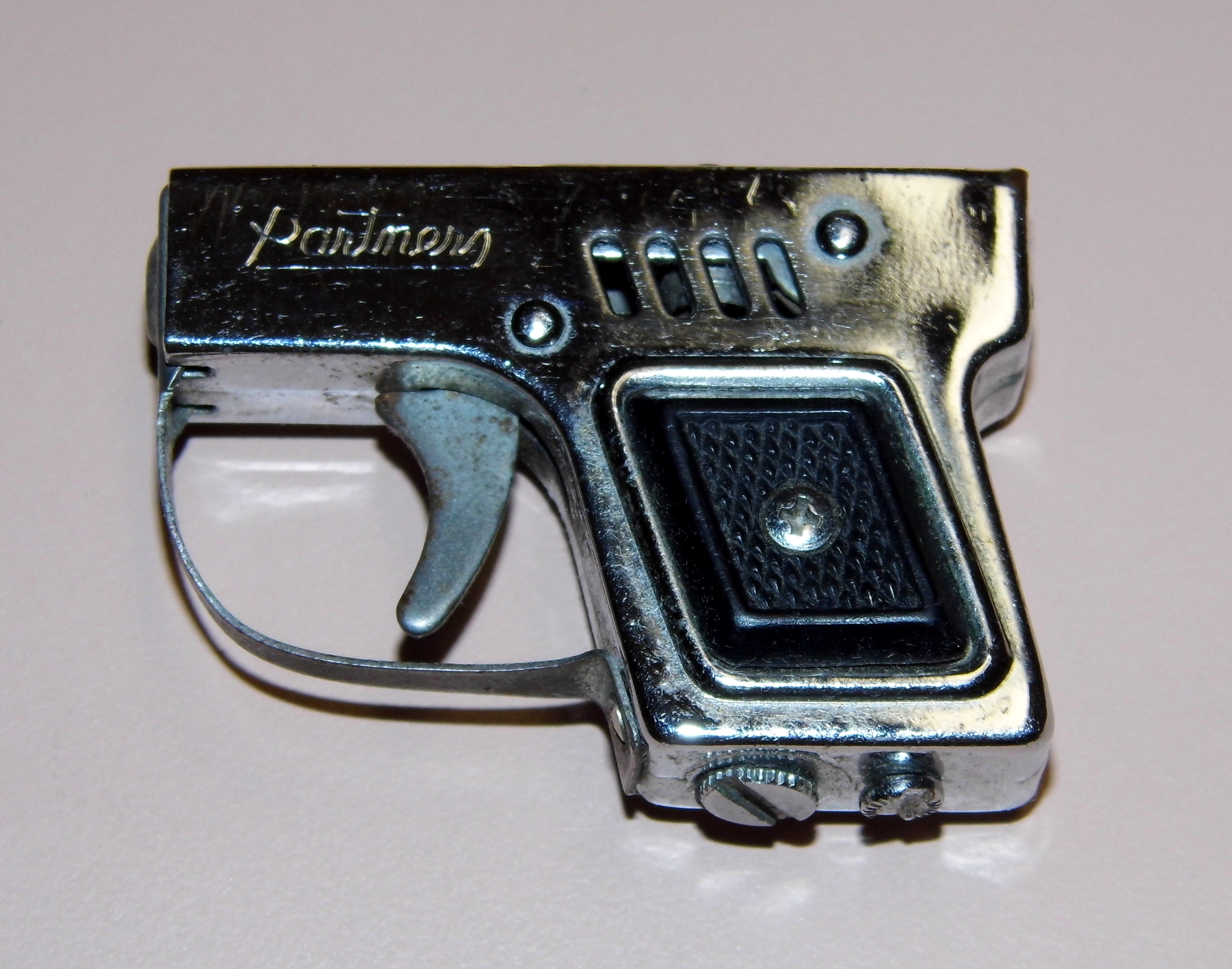
Vintage Miniature Pistol-Shaped Partner Cigarette Lighter

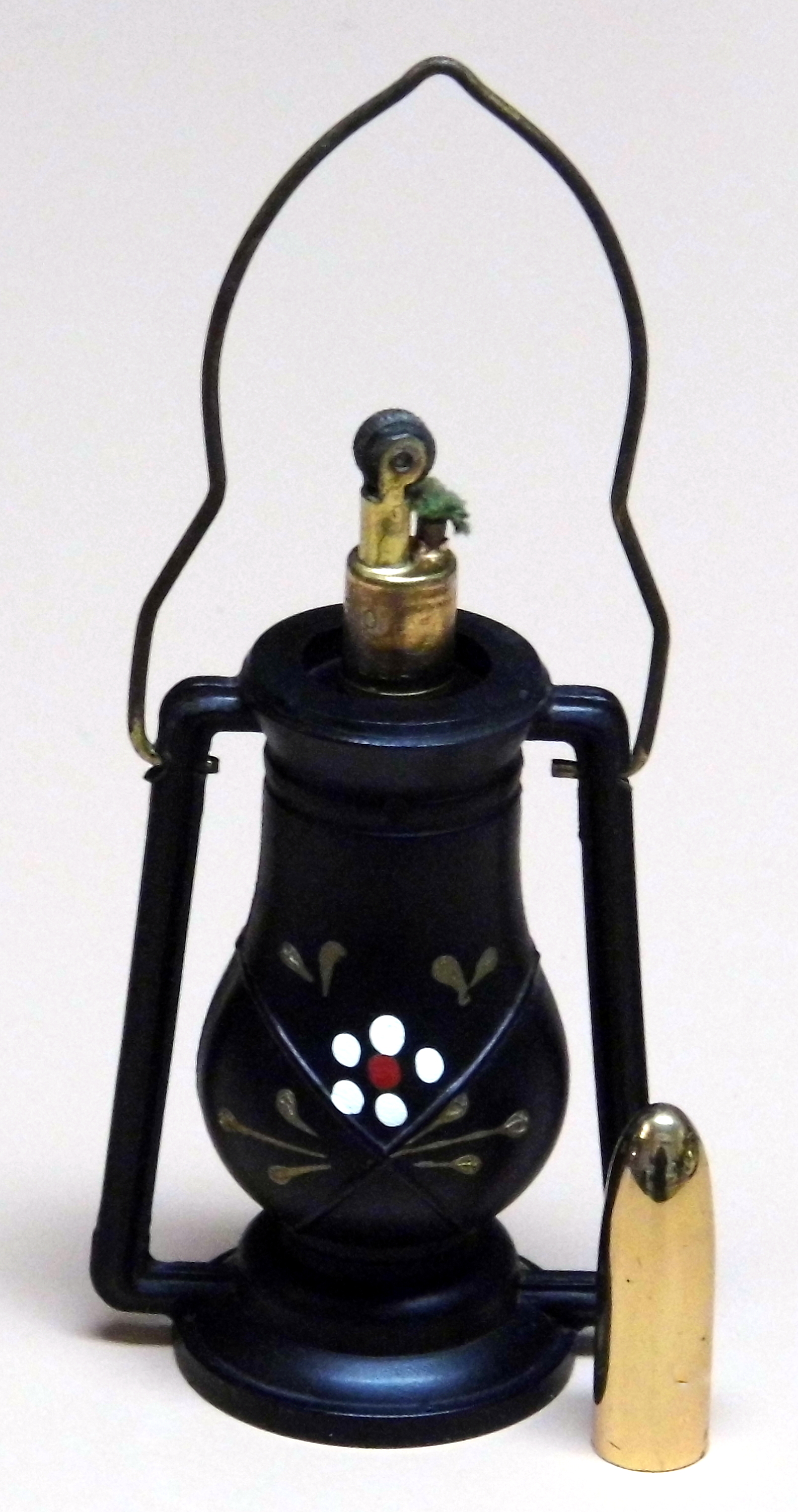
Vintage Weston Miniature Lantern Cigarette Lighter

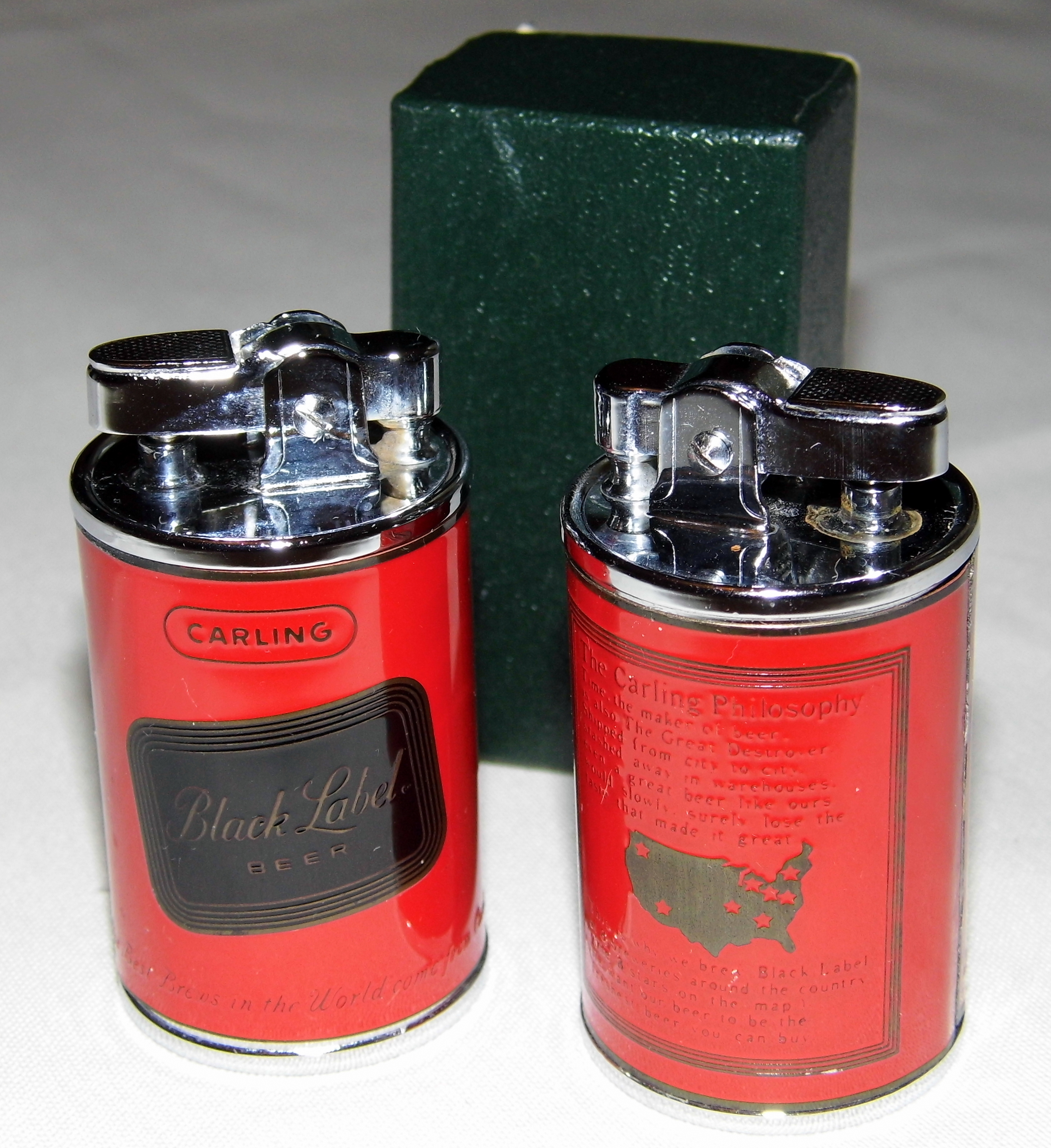
A pair of Vintage Carling Black Label Miniature Beer Can Cigarette Lighters

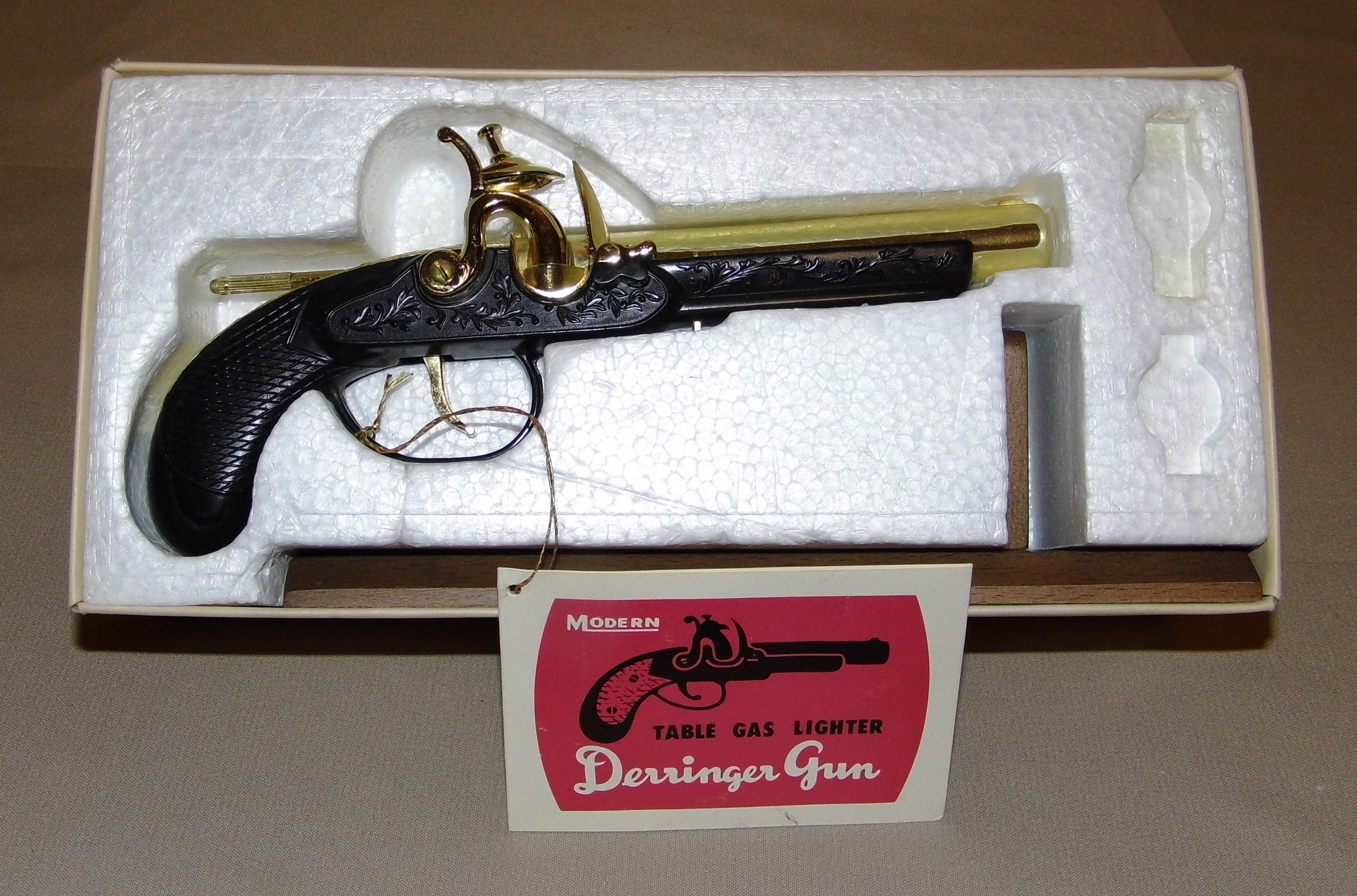
Vintage "Derringer Gun" Table Gas Lighter
