= Brett Madden =

American actress and voice actress (1978–2020)

- Born: Brett Barcroft Madden; 22 September 1978; Hartford, Connecticut, US
- Died: 19 September 2020 (aged 41); Telluride, Colorado, US
- Other name: Brett B. Kelly
- Education: Bradford Central Christian High School
- Alma mater: University of Vermont
- Occupations: Voice actress; Actress; Producer
- Years active: 2002 – 2020
- Agent(s): Don Buchwald & Associates; Associates Agency
- Spouse: Neil MacLean Kelly (m. 2009; died 2020)
- Children: 1
- Relatives: George G. Blaisdell (great-grandfather); Harriett Blaisdell (grandmother); Sarah Blaisdell Dorn (grandmother)

Brett Madden (September 22, 1978 – September 19, 2020), also known by her married name Brett Barcroft Madden Kelly, was an American actress and voice actress. She is best known for her voice and likeness role as Alice Wake in the Remedy Entertainment video games Alan Wake, Alan Wake: The Signal, Alan Wake: The Writer and Alan Wake's American Nightmare.

== Early life and education ==
Brett Barcroft Madden was born on September 22, 1978, in Hartford, Connecticut. She was the great-granddaughter of George G. Blaisdell, the founder of Zippo Manufacturing Company.

She attended the Community School of Naples, Florida, and Bradford Central Christian High School in Pennsylvania, where she participated in basketball, cheerleading, ski club, and drama club. Madden graduated from the Taft School, a preparatory school in Watertown, Connecticut, in 1996. At Taft, she played on the varsity field hockey team and was an art editor for the school's annual publication. She was a talented artist and spent much of her free time in the art studio.

Madden attended the University of Vermont, graduating in 2000 with a major in Studio Art and a minor in Theatre. She studied art in Florence, Italy, during her time at UVM and was a cast member in a production of The Elephant Man during her junior year. Concurrently, she participated in summer acting workshops at the Stella Adler Studio of Acting in New York City.

== Career ==
Madden's early professional experience included internships at Zippo Manufacturing Company from 1994 to 1996. From 2004 to 2006, she worked at MacGuffin Films, starting as a receptionist and later becoming a production supervisor.

In 2002, she appeared in short film Beccerra as Renee Beccerra. In 2006, Madden worked as a commercial actor and voice-over artist represented by Don Buchwald and Associates Agency. Her acting career largely focused on voice-over performances in the video game industry. In a 2014 interview, she mentioned growing up with classic games like Mario Brothers and Sonic the Hedgehog, and being amazed by the realistic visuals and storytelling capabilities of modern video games when she was cast in Alan Wake. In 2011, she voiced several characters in video game Homefront. She voiced Alice Wake in Alan Wake and its related episodic content (The Signal, The Writer) and sequel (American Nightmare). She provided both the voice and the physical likeness for the character.

In 2023 the game Alan Wake 2 was dedicated to her memory and the role of Alice Wake was recast to actress Christina Cole for the sequel.

== Personal life ==
Madden married Neil MacLean Kelly on June 9, 2009. They had one daughter together, Nico Blaisdell Kelly.

== Death ==
Madden died on September 19, 2020, in Telluride, Colorado, at the age of 41, after a four-year battle with brain cancer. She was residing in Telluride at the time of her death. She was laid to rest at Willowdale Cemetery.

== Filmography ==
=== Television ===
| Year | Title | Role | Notes |
|---|---|---|---|
| 2023 | Alan Wake II: Behind the Scenes | Alice Wake | Posthumous release |

=== Film ===
| Year | Title | Role | Notes |
|---|---|---|---|
| 2002 | Beccerra | Renee Beccerra | Short film |
| 2010 | Alan Wake: Building the Drama | Alice Wake | Voice |
| 2010 | Alan Wake: Building the Thriller | Alice Wake | Voice |
| 2010 | Alan Wake: Building the Technology | Alice Wake | Voice |
| 2012 | Alan Wake's American Nightmare: Dev Diary | Alice Wake | Voice |

=== Video games ===
List of voice performances in video games
| Year | Title | Role | Notes |
|---|---|---|---|
| 2010 | Alan Wake | Alice Wake | Xbox 360 |
| 2010 | Alan Wake: The Signal | Alice Wake | Voice |
| 2010 | Alan Wake: The Writer | Alice Wake | Voice |
| 2011 | Homefront | Computer voice / Soldiers | Additional voices |
| 2012 | Alan Wake's American Nightmare | Alice Wake | Xbox 360 |
| 2021 | Alan Wake Remastered | Alice Wake | Posthumous release |
| 2023 | Alan Wake 2 | Alice Wake (motion-capture) | Posthumous release |
