= Gibbs College – Livingston =

College in Livingston, New Jersey, U.S.

Coordinates: 40.8019°N 74.3552°W

Gibbs College Livingston
- Type: Private
- President: William C. Ehrhardt
- Location: Livingston, New Jersey, United States
- Campus: Suburban

Gibbs College – Livingston was a private two-year college in Livingston, New Jersey, United States. It was part of the Gibbs College group of private schools founded by Katherine Gibbs. At one time the Livingston campus had an annual enrollment of approximately 1,000 students. The school was accredited by the Accrediting Council for Independent Colleges and Schools (ACICS) to award associate degrees and certificates, and by the New Jersey Commission on Higher Education.

This branch of Gibbs College was originally located in Montclair, New Jersey, where it opened in 1950. By 2000 the Montclair location was deemed too small. For its new campus, the college redeveloped a former Allison Corporation manufacturing plant on New Jersey Route 10. The project required five years of planning and nineteen months to obtain required permits, sparking a public discussion about undesirable regulatory obstacles to adaptive reuse of existing buildings. The resulting project had a 130,000-square-foot (12,000 m^{2}) building on a 16-acre (65,000 m^{2}) campus with lecture rooms, computer labs, a large library, cafeteria, student reception center, and offices. Within a few years, however, the campus was closed as part of a larger contraction of Gibbs College campuses.
