= George Grant Blaisdell =

American inventor (1895–1978)

- Born: June 5, 1895; Bradford, Pennsylvania, US
- Died: October 4, 1978 (aged 83); Miami Beach, Florida, US
- Burial place: Bradford, Pennsylvania, US
- Spouse: Miriam
- Children: Harriett Blaisdell (daughter); Sarah Blaisdell Dorn (daughter)
- Parents: Philo Chase Blaisdell (father); Sarah Frances Grant Blaisdell (mother)
- Relatives: Brett Madden (great-granddaughter)

George Blaisdell (June 5, 1895 – October 4, 1978) was an American inventor known for creating the Zippo lighter, based on an Austrian lighter in 1933. In the 1940s, he purchased buildings that could be converted into factories capable of making the Zippo lighter.

== Childhood and education ==
Blaisdell quit school in grade 5, leading his father to send him to a military academy. Blaisdell attended the academy until his dismissal three years later. Thus, Blaisdell only attended school until grade 8. Thereafter, he worked for his family company, the Blaisdell Machinery Company.

== Family link in advertising ==
Zippo advertisements of the day commonly had the initials PCB or SGB engraved on illustrations of Zippo lighters. These initials were a homage to George's Parents, Philo C Blaisdell and Sarah Grant Blaisdell.

== Death ==
George died on October 4, 1978, in Miami Beach, Florida, at the age of 83. After his death, his daughters Sarah Blaisdell Dorn and Harriett Blaisdell took control of the company.

== Sources ==
- "George Blaisdell". Pabook.libraries.psu.edu. Archived from the original on 2015-05-08.
- "Zippo.com". Zippo.com.
