= Clipper (lighter) =

Refillable butane lighter brand

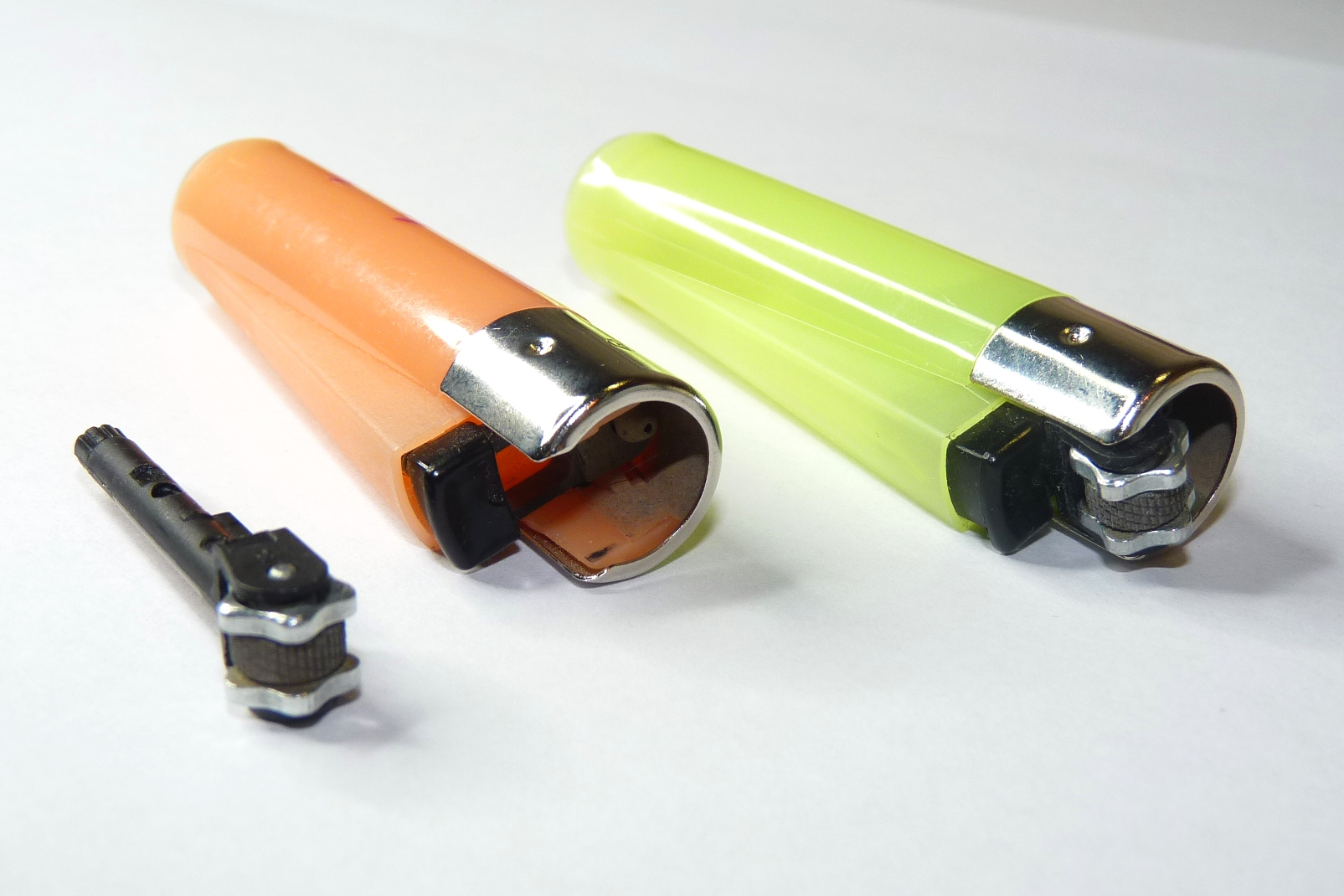
Clipper lighters; on the left, the flint system which has been removed from the orange one

Clipper is the brand name of a type of refillable butane lighter, designed by Enric Sardà and owned by Flamagas S.A., which was founded in 1959.

The lighters are mostly produced in Barcelona, with others manufactured in Chennai and Shanghai. Clipper has a wide range of lighters, gas refills and other accessories. The first Clipper lighter was made in 1972, and global production is now around 450 million units a year, making it the second-largest lighter manufacturer in the world, behind BIC.

The Clipper brand is a division of Flamagas S.A., which also distributes stationery and electronics for such brands as Casio and Daewoo. Flamagas S.A. is headed by Puig, and both companies are subsidiaries of the Exea Corporation.

== Associations ==
Some people associate the use of the Clipper lighter with stoners. This is due to its flint system, which smokers often use to pack joints and the fact that the flame gets higher when held at a downwards angle to light a bowl.

== Dimensions ==
The dimensions of the different models of Clipper lighters are as follows:

Model	Length (mm)	Diameter (mm)
CP11 - large	74	16
CP21 - medium	71	14
CP12 - pocket	63	16
CP22 - micro	63	14
CJK11 - jet	63	16

== In popular culture ==
- British garage act The Streets used the Clipper lighter as its logo. The lighter (bearing the name of the artist) appears on all album covers bar the first album, which featured a Swan lighter. Their merchandise includes branded Clipper lighters.
- Damien Hirst used images of the Clipper lighter, among others like Bic, in a series of artworks together with Silk Cut.
