= Gas lighter =

Device for lighting gas stoves

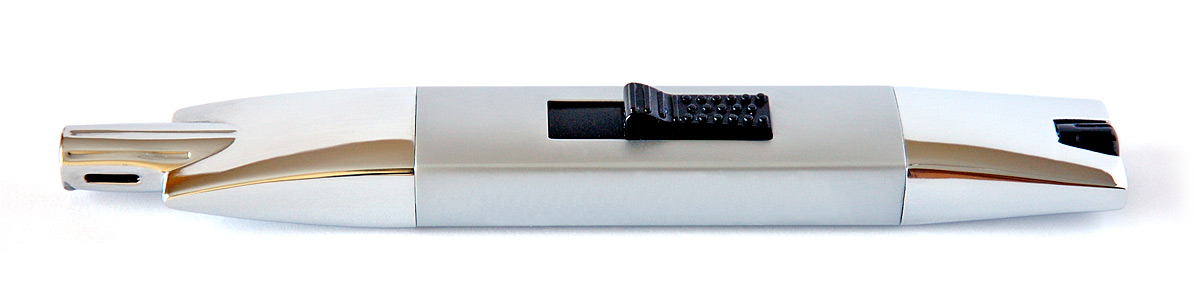
Wand lighter

A gas lighter is a device used to ignite a gas stove burner. It is used for gas stoves which do not have automatic ignition systems. It uses a physical phenomenon which is called the piezo-electric effect to generate an electric spark that ignites the combustible gas from the stove’s burner.

== Principle ==
The phenomenon of piezo-electric effect can be briefly explained as follows: when pressure is applied along one axis of a crystal (mechanical axis), a potential difference develops across the transverse axis (electrical axis) of the crystal. The crystals which exhibit such property are called piezo-electric crystals. Tourmaline and quartz are some well known piezo-electric crystals.

== Operation ==
The gas lighter is mostly cylindrical in shape and consists of a piezo-electric crystal over which a spring-loaded hammer is placed. The hammer and spring set up is attached to a button. When this button is pressed, the hammer is moved away from the piezo-electric crystal. When the button is pressed over a limit, the spring releases the hammer. The hammer hits the piezo-electric crystal. Due to piezo-electric effect, a high voltage is generated in the range of 800 volts. The lighter is wired in such a way that this whole voltage is applied in a small region of air gap between two metallic points. Due to high voltage generated, the air is ionized and acts as a path for the discharge. This electric discharge is the spark which when exposed to the combustible gas from the stove ignites it to produce flame. In gas lighters, piezo-electric ceramics like lead zirconate titanate also known as PZT are used due to their low cost and high sensitivity.

== Older versions ==
Before piezo-electric lighters became available, gas stove burners were often lit with a flint spark lighter. Some examples of these are shown below.

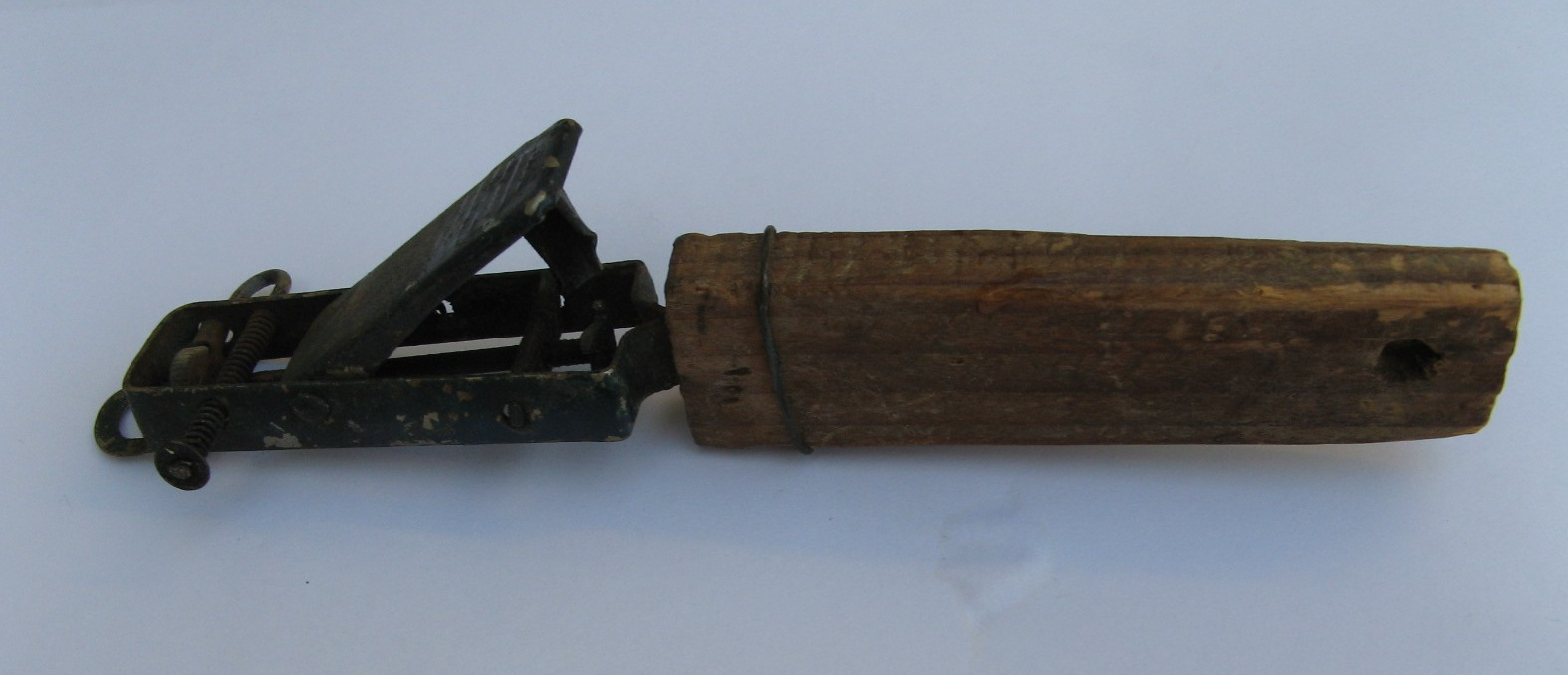

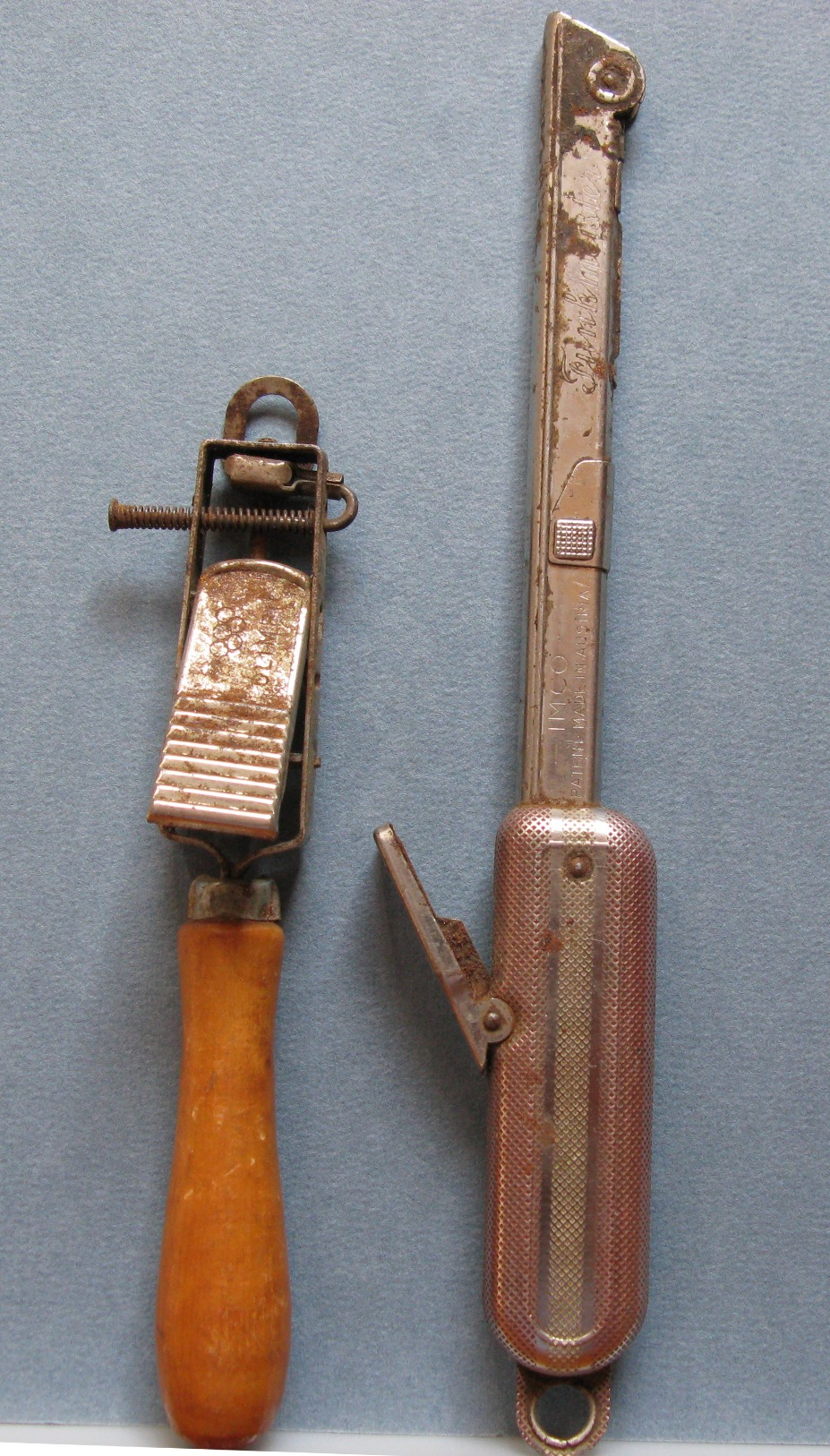

== See also ==
- Butane torch
- Lighter
