= Lighter =

Handheld device used to generate a flame

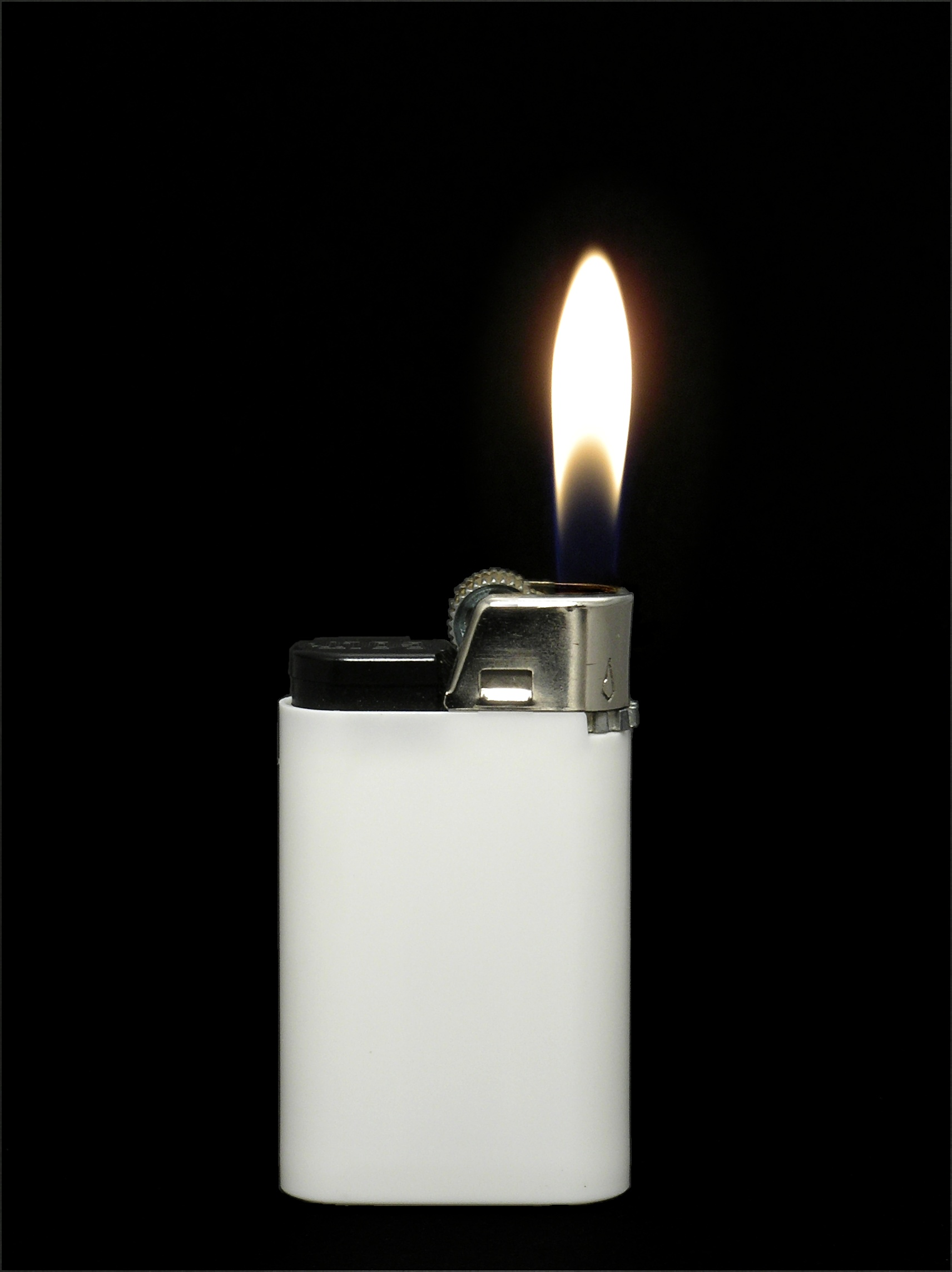
An ignited lighter

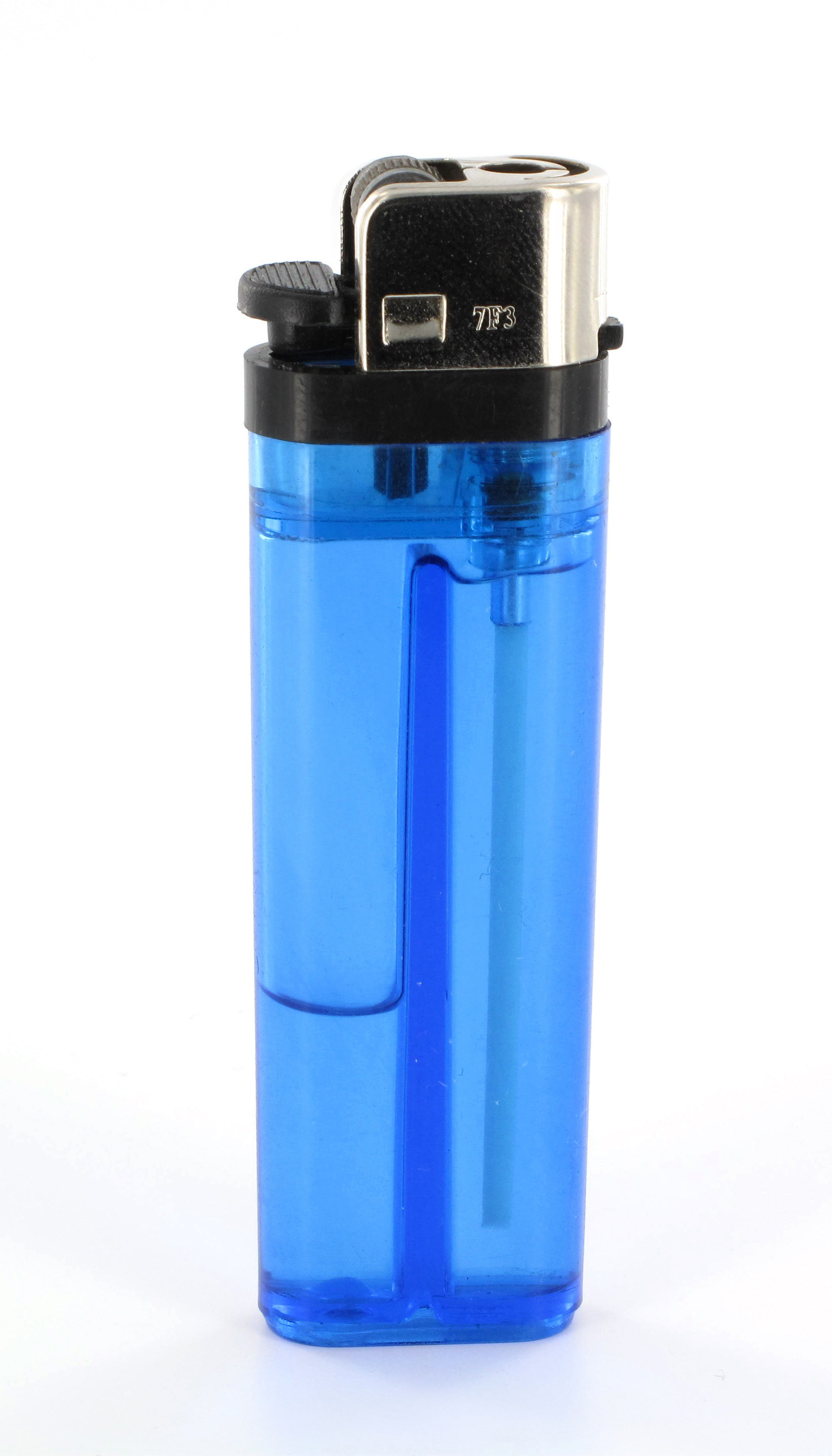
Disposable lighter

A lighter is a portable device which uses mechanical or electrical means to create a controlled flame, and can be used to ignite a variety of flammable items, such as cigarettes, butane gas, fireworks, candles, or campfires. Some lighters use a consumable chemical fuel, others use electricity from a battery.

A chemical-powered lighter typically consists of a metal or plastic container filled with a flammable liquid, a compressed flammable gas, or in rarer cases a flammable solid (e.g. rope in a trench lighter). These have a means of ignition to produce the flame, and some provision for extinguishing the flame or else controlling it to such a degree that users may extinguish it with their breath.

Electric lighters come in two varieties. One type uses hot plasma generated with an electric arc. The other type uses a resistive heating element; these were first formally used by Friedrich Wilhelm Schindler to light cigars, and have since been incorporated into cigarette lighters attached to automobile auxiliary power outlets.

== History ==
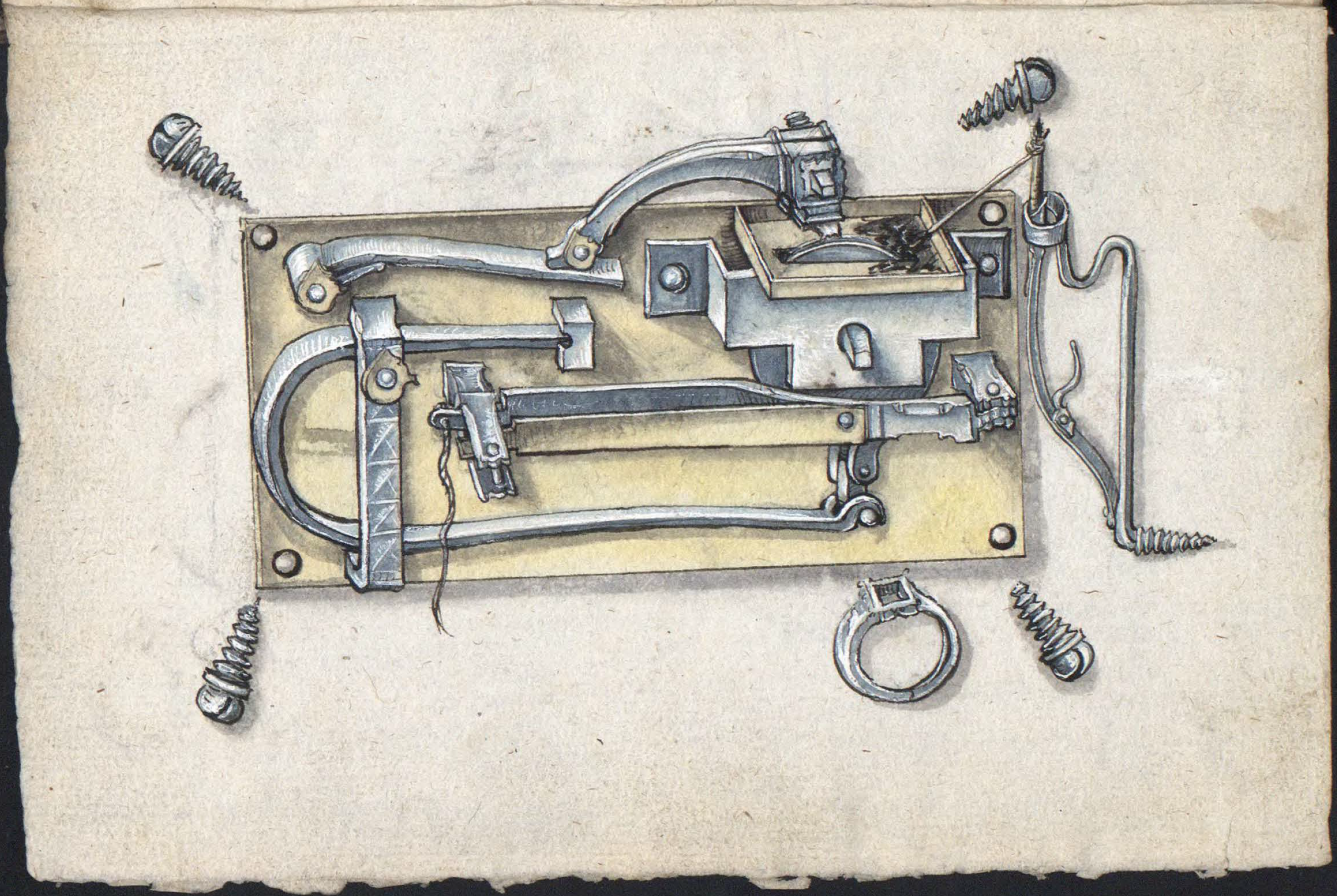
Concept of a wall-mounted automatic wheellock lighter, that can be activated by opening a door from Löffelholz-Codex, Nuremberg 1505

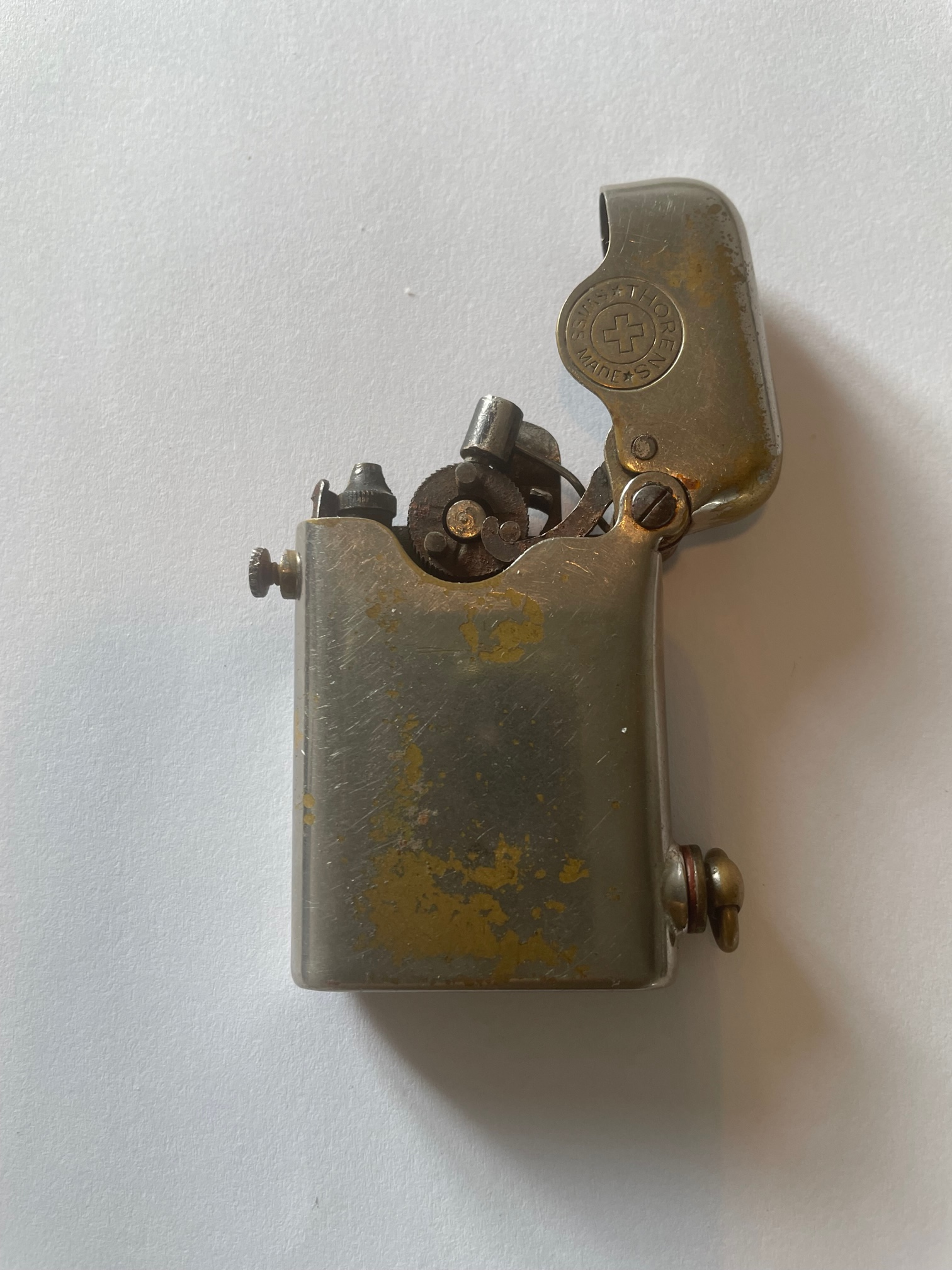
Thorens "Standard Original" model, introduced in 1919

The first lighters were converted flintlock pistols that used gunpowder. In 1662, Turkish traveler Evliya Çelebi visited Vienna as a member of an Ottoman diplomatic mission, and admired the lighters being manufactured there: "Enclosed in a kind of tiny box are tinder, a steel, sulphur, and resinous wood. When struck just like a firearm wheel, the wood bursts into flame. This is useful for soldiers on campaign." One of the first lighters was invented by a German chemist named Johann Wolfgang Döbereiner in 1823, and was often called Döbereiner's lamp. This lighter worked by passing flammable hydrogen gas, produced within the lighter by a chemical reaction, over a platinum metal catalyst, which in turn caused it to ignite and give off a great amount of heat and light.

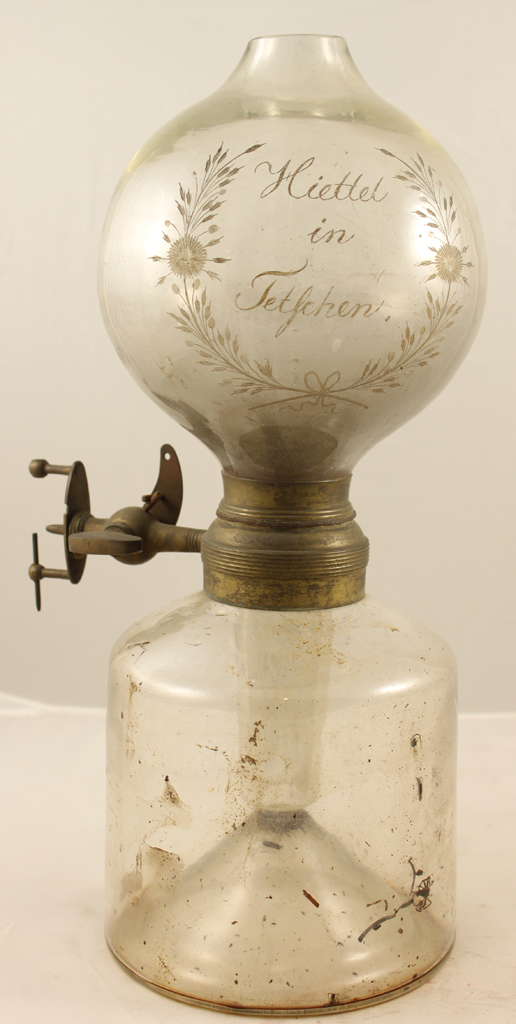
A Döbereiner's lamp

The development of ferrocerium (commonly called "flint", though this is a misnomer) by Carl Auer von Welsbach in 1903 has made modern lighters possible. When scratched, it produces a large spark that is responsible for lighting the fuel of many lighters, and is suitably inexpensive for use in disposable items.

Using Carl Auer von Welsbach's flint, companies such as Ronson were able to develop practical and easy-to-use lighters. In 1910, Ronson released the first Pist-O-Liter, and in 1913, the company developed its first lighter, called the "Wonderlite", which was a permanent match-style of lighter.

During WWI, soldiers started to create lighters out of empty cartridge cases. During that time, one of the soldiers came up with a means to insert a chimney cap with holes in it to make it more windproof.

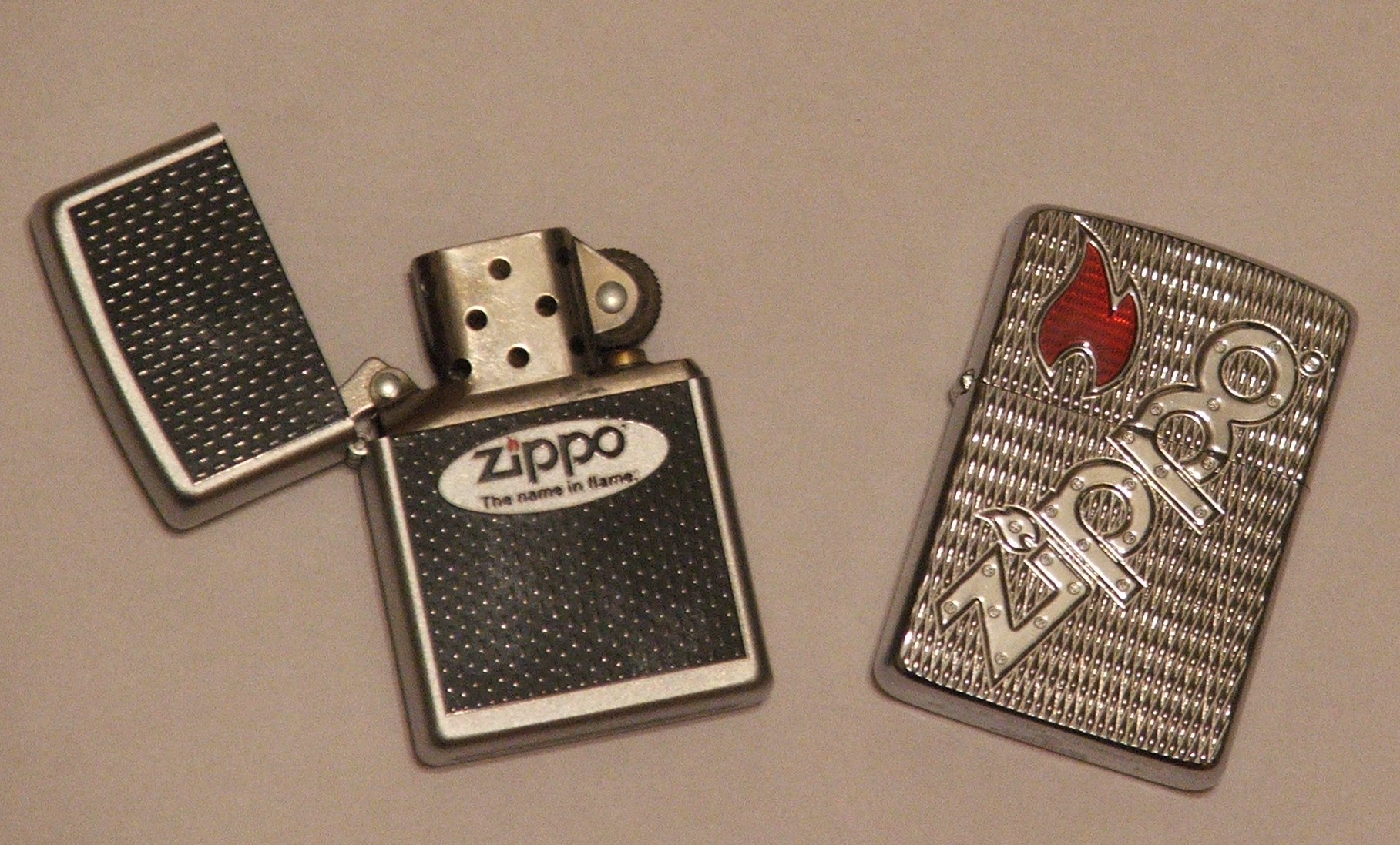
Two Zippo lighters, one open, one closed

The Zippo lighter and company were invented and founded by George Grant Blaisdell in 1932. The Zippo was noted for its reliability, "Life Time Warranty" and marketing as "Wind-Proof". Zippos still use light petroleum distillate, or naphtha, as their fuel source (of which they sell their own brand).

In the 1950s, a switch occurred in the fuel of choice from naphtha to butane, as butane allows for a controllable flame and has less odour. The butane lighter was invented and patented in France in 1936 by Henri Pingeot, whose patent was acquired by Marcel Quercia. Quercia was the son of a goldsmith whose company sold several different brands of lighters, and saw promise in Pingeot's invention. During the German occupation of France, Quercia worked with Georges Ferdinand, a professor at the lycée Arago, to further develop and refine the butane lighter, resulting in the introduction of the Flaminaire Gentry table lighter in June 1947.

This also led to the use of piezoelectric spark, which replaced the need for a flint wheel in some lighters and was used in many Ronson lighters.

Around the end of the 20th century, most of the world's lighters were produced in France, the United States, China, and Thailand.

== Operation ==
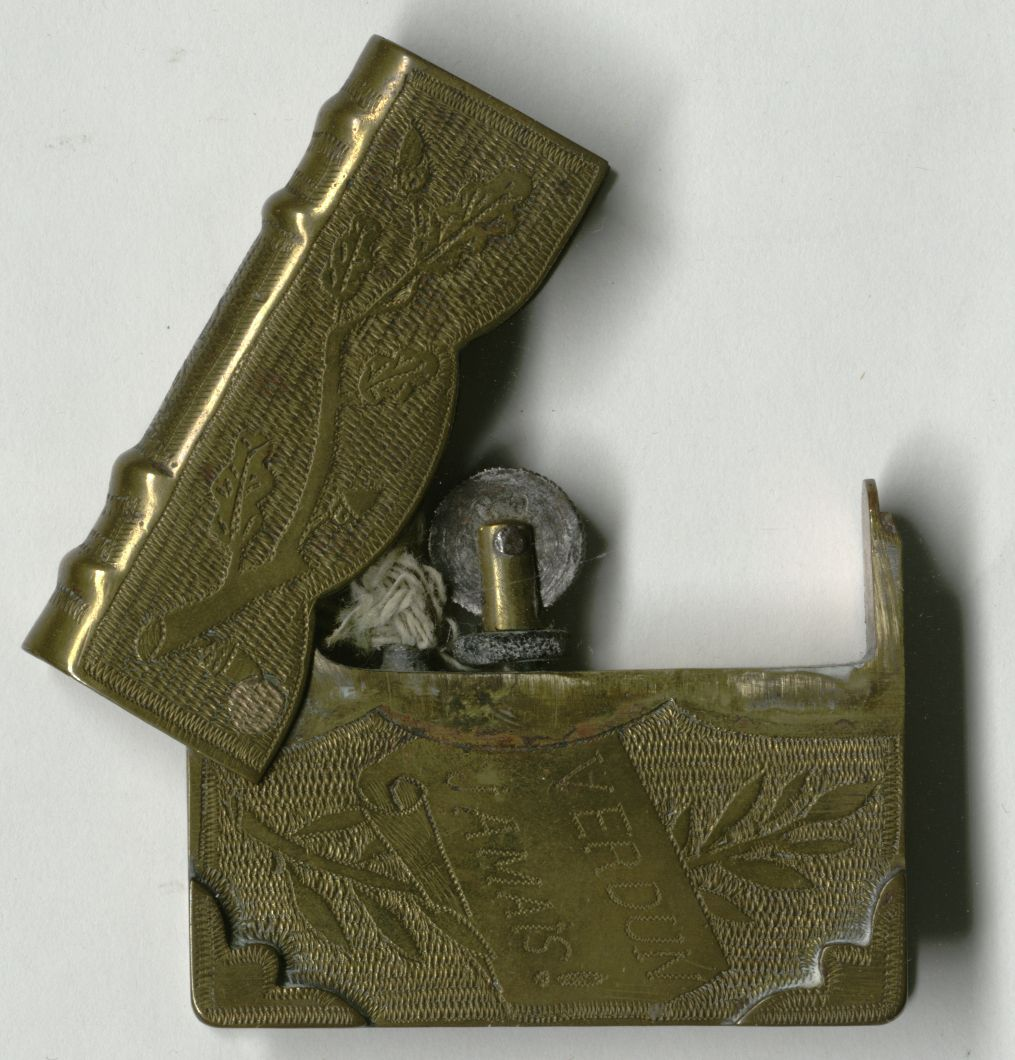
A trench art lighter from the Battle of Verdun (1916)

Earlier lighters mostly burned "lighter fluid", naphtha, saturating a cloth wick and fibre packing to absorb the fluid and prevent it from leaking. The wick is covered by an enclosed top to prevent the volatile liquid from evaporating, which is opened to operate the lighter, and extinguishes the flame when closed after use.

Later lighters use liquefied butane gas as fuel, with a valved orifice that allows gas to escape at a controlled rate when the lighter is used.

Schematic diagram of a lighter's inside workings

Older lighters were usually ignited by a spark created by striking metal against a lighter flint. Later, piezo ignition was introduced; a piezoelectric crystal is compressed on pressing a button, generating an electric spark. In naphtha lighters, the liquid is sufficiently volatile, and flammable vapour is present as soon as the top of the lighter is opened. Butane lighters combine the striking action with the opening of the valve to release gas. The spark ignites the flammable gas, causing a flame to come out of the lighter that continues until either the top is closed (naphtha type) or the valve is released (butane type).

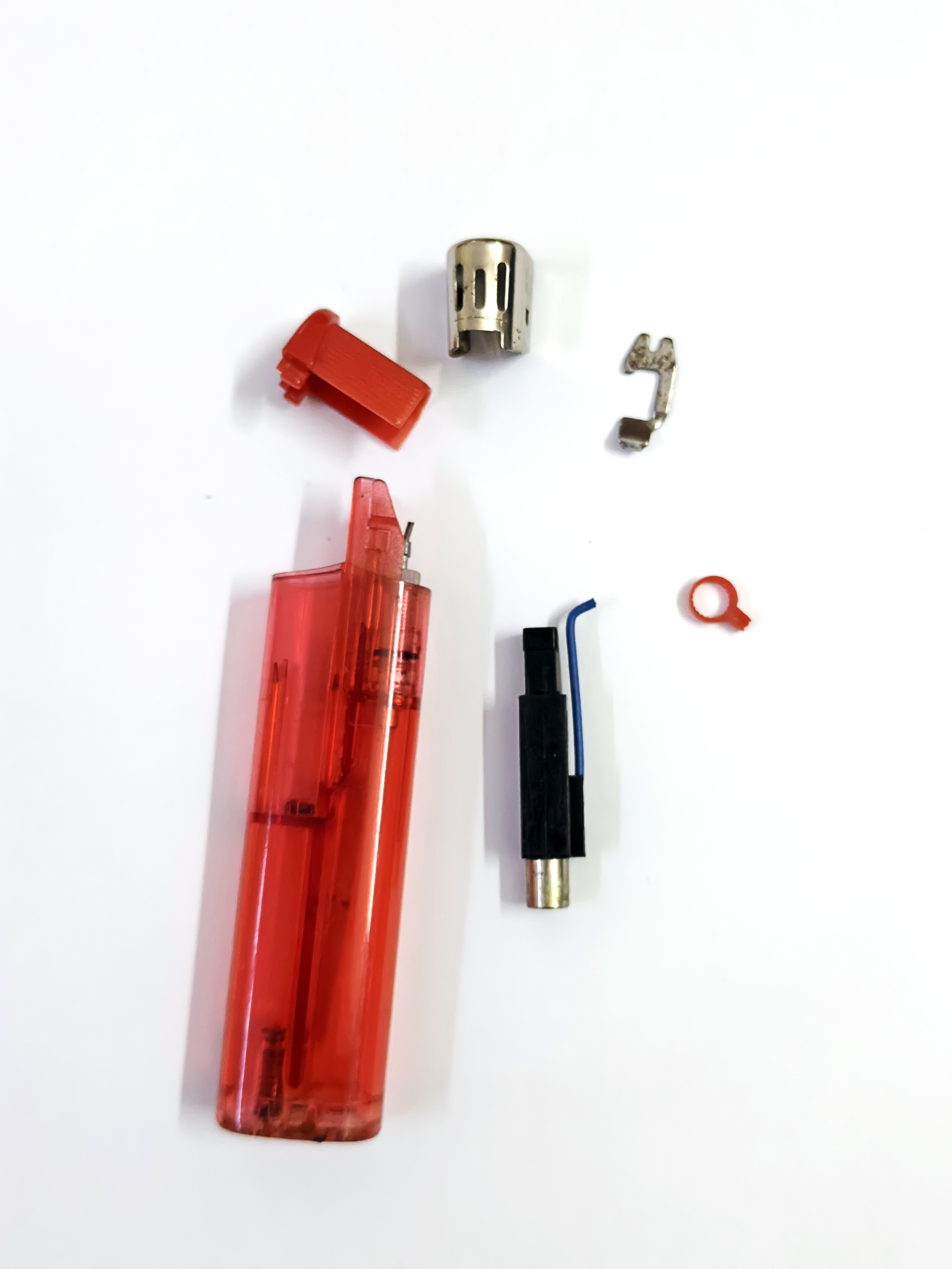
Disassembled Butane lighter

A metal enclosure with air holes, designed to allow mixing of fuel and air while making the lighter less sensitive to wind, usually surrounds the flame. The gas jet in butane lighters mixes air and gas using Bernoulli's principle, requiring air holes that are much smaller and further from the flame.

Specialized "windproof" butane lighters are manufactured for demanding conditions, such as shipboard, high altitude, and wet climates. Some dedicated models double as synthetic rope cutters. Such lighters are often far hotter than normal lighters (those that use a "soft flame") and can burn in excess of 1,100 °C (2,010 °F). The windproof capabilities are not achieved from higher-pressure fuel; windproof lighters use the same fuel (butane) as standard lighters, so develop the same vapour pressure. Instead, windproof lighters mix the fuel with air and pass the butane–air mixture through a catalytic coil. An electric spark starts the initial flame, and soon the coil is hot enough to cause the fuel–air mixture to burn on contact.

== Other types ==
=== Jet lighter ===
As opposed to lighters of the naphtha or standard butane type (whether refillable or disposable), which combust incompletely and thus create a sooty, orange "safety" flame, jet lighters produce a blue flame that in some cases is almost invisible and invariably burns at a far higher temperature. The spark in such lighters is almost always produced by an electric arc (as seen below), but some jet lighters burn with incomplete combustion. It produces a distinct "roaring" noise. Typically "torch" lighters have one to three flames (lined up), but some newer models may have up to five jets. This style of butane lighter is typically used for lighting a cigar.

=== Electric arc lighter ===
Arc lighters use a spark to create a plasma conduit between electrodes, which is then maintained by a lower voltage. The arc is then applied to a flammable substance to cause ignition. The basic version has one arc, but upgraded versions typically have two (or even three) intersecting arcs, providing backup in case an electrode (or two) stops working.

=== Match lighter ===
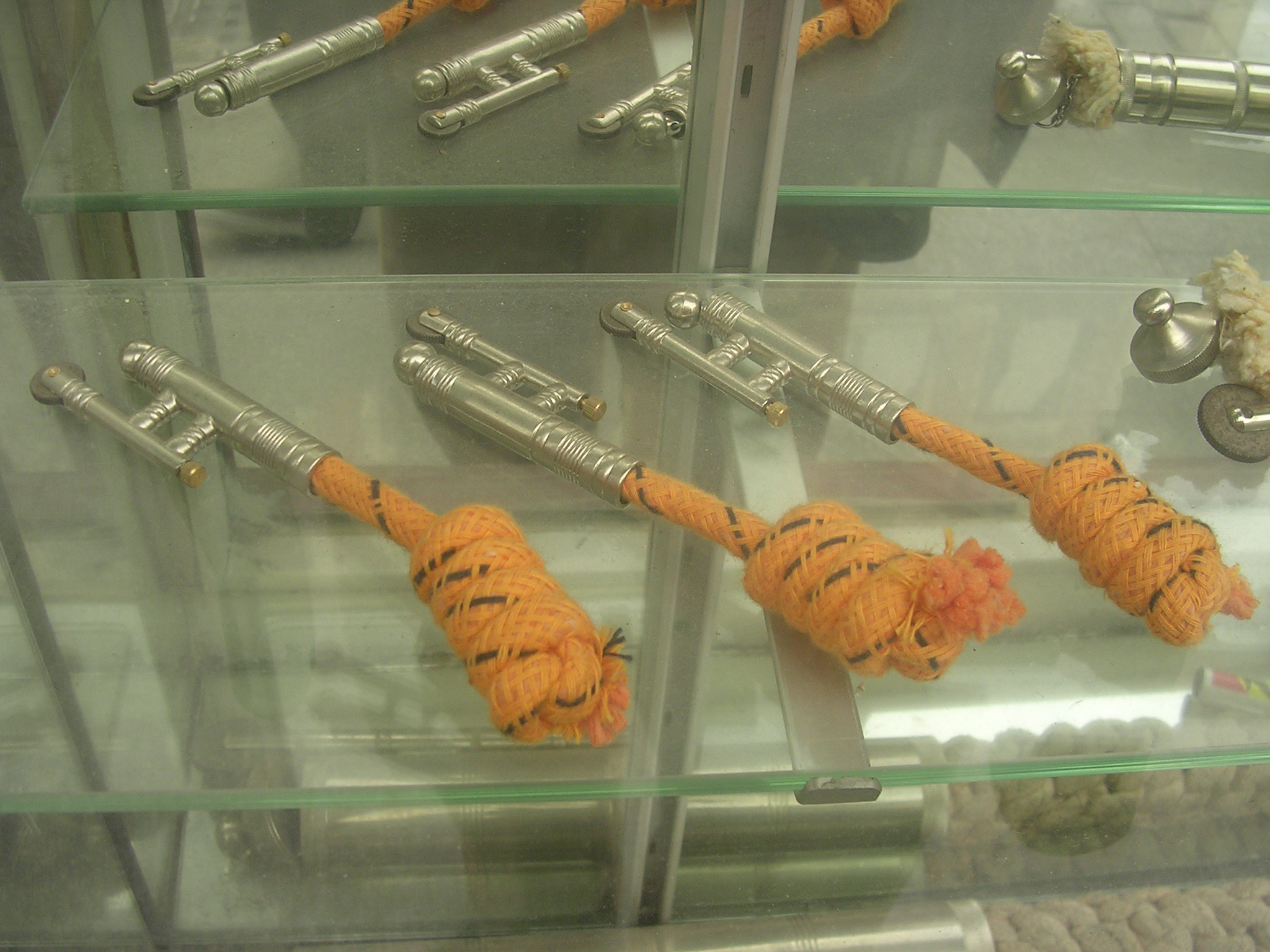
Traditional Spanish match lighters

Not to be confused with the meaning of "match" as in matchsticks or the "permanent match" (see below), this type of lighter consists of a length of slow match in a holder, with means to ignite and to extinguish the match. While the glowing match does not generally supply enough energy to start a fire without further kindling, it is fully sufficient to light a cigarette. The main advantage of this design shows itself in windy conditions, where the glow of the match is fanned by the wind instead of being blown out.

=== Permanent match ===
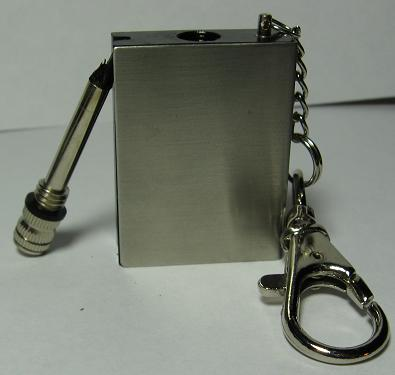
A permanent match lighter with the metal "match" leaning against the shell

A typical form of lighter is the permanent match or everlasting match, consisting of a naphtha fuel-filled metal shell and a separate threaded-metal rod assembly—the "match"—serving as the striker and wick. This "metal match" is stored screwed into the fuel storage compartment - the shell.

The fuel-saturated striker/wick assembly is unscrewed to remove, and scratched against a flint on the side of the case to create a spark. Its concealed wick catches fire, resembling a match. The flame is extinguished by blowing it out before screwing the "match" back into the shell, where it absorbs fuel for the next use. An advantage over other naphtha lighters is that the fuel compartment is sealed shut with a rubber o-ring, which slows or stops fuel evaporation.

=== Flameless lighter ===
A flameless lighter is a safe alternative to traditional lighters. It uses an enclosed heating element, which glows red hot; the device does not produce an open flame. The most common type utilizes an electrically heated wire, commonly seen in non-commercial vehicles produced in the late 20th century. While once standard even in budget vehicles, they are being phased out as smoking rates decline in the US since the turn of the century.

=== Catalytic lighter ===
Catalytic lighters use methanol or methylated spirits as fuel and a thin platinum wire that heats up in the presence of flammable vapours and produces a flame.

=== Solar lighter ===
A solar lighter is a pocket-sized stainless steel parabolic mirror, shaped to concentrate sunlight on a small prong holding combustible material at the focal point. A revival of an old gadget marketed as a cigarette lighter by RadioShack in the 1980s, it is a useful hiking and camping accessory as its functioning is not affected by having been soaked by rain or falling in rivers or the sea. To operate, it needs sunlight and a small piece of flammable material. Once a glowing spark has been achieved, careful blowing can produce a blaze.

== ISO Standards ==
The International Standard EN ISO 9994:2002 and the European standard EN 13869:2002 are two primary references.

The ISO establishes nonfunctional specifications on quality, reliability, and safety of lighters, and appropriate test procedures. For instance, a lighter should generate flame only through positive action on the part of the user, two or more independent actions by the user, or an actuating force greater than or equal to 15 Newtons. The standard also specifies other safety features, such as the lighter's maximum flame height and its resistance to elevated temperatures, dropping, and damages from continuous burning. However, the standard does not include child-resistance specifications.

The European standard EN 13869:2002 establishes child-resistance specifications and defines as novelty lighters those that resemble another object commonly recognized as appealing to children younger than 51 months, or those that have entertaining audio or animated effects.

As matches, lighters, and other heat sources are the leading causes of fire deaths for children, many jurisdictions, such as the EU, have prohibited the marketing of novelty or non-child-resistant lighters. Examples of child-resistance features include the use of a smooth or shielded spark wheel. Many people remove these features, making the lighter easier to ignite.

In 2005, the fourth edition of the ISO standard was released (ISO9994:2005). The main change to the 2004 Standard is the inclusion of specifications on safety symbols.

== See also ==
- Automobile auxiliary power outlet
- Bic lighter
- Butane torch
- Clipper (lighter)
- Gas lighter
