= Gibbs College =

Former for-profit institution

Katharine Gibbs School was a for-profit institution of higher learning based in the United States, founded by Katharine Gibbs and Mary Ryan in 1911. Begun in Providence, Rhode Island, the school was intended to educate women to be secretaries, breaking away from the more common profession of stenography. The school expanded into a school system crossing the United States at multiple campuses.

== Overview ==
The school was first founded in 1911 as the Providence School at 155 Angell Street in Providence, Rhode Island, an institution that focused on the career education of young women. A few years later, the institution expanded with satellite campuses in Boston, Massachusetts, New York City and Montclair, New Jersey, and was renamed for its founder. It specialized in education in industries such as design, business administration, computer technology, criminal justice, and health care. The college was nationally accredited by the Accrediting Council for Independent Colleges and Schools.

Crowell Collier and Macmillan acquired Katharine Gibbs School in 1968. In 1989, Macmillan sold the schools to Phillips Colleges. K-III Communications (now Rent Group) acquired the school from Phillips in 1994. In 1997, the Career Education Corporation (CEC) acquired the Gibbs Group. In 2009, it shut down its campuses after a failed effort to sell the Gibbs franchise. The former Cranston campus for Gibbs College sold for $16 million to Achievement First in 2022. They had been leasing the property for several years.

== History ==
=== Founding of the school ===
In 1911, Katharine Gibbs and her sister Mary Ryan borrowed $1,000 from friends and opened their first secretarial school in Providence, Rhode Island. Katharine took on this business venture after her father's and husband's deaths left her and her two sons without a means of income. A year prior, Mary Ryan enrolled in the Providence School for Secretaries in Providence, Rhode Island and became an assistant teacher at the school. When approached by the school's owner to buy the school, Mary and Katharine decided to purchase it together with Mary teaching and Katharine serving as an administrator. Both sisters also took a stenography program at Simmons College, in Boston.

Katharine and Mary shifted the focus of the school and changed the curriculum from being a school of stenography to a secretarial training school. Initially, the school was not marketed specifically to women, with the first student being a man named Marshall H. Sheldon. The school was originally located at 155 Angell Street in Providence, Rhode Island, now known as the Churchill House, Brown University's Africana Studies Department and the Rites and Reason Theatre. The school was advertised via a variety of names including the Gibbs Private School for Secretaries, Gibbs Private School of Stenography, and the Syllabic Shorthand School.

=== Growth and expansion ===
Labor shortages from World War I pushed more women into the work space and, by 1917, the school was advertising “Secretarial Training for Educated Women”. That same year, the American Red Cross invited Katharine to manage a secretarial training school in Boston, Massachusetts, resulting in Katharine opening the Boston School for Secretaries. In 1918 she opened another school in New York City on Park Avenue at 40th Street, called the New York School for Secretaries. Renamed the Katharine Gibbs Schools for Secretarial and Executive Training for Women in 1920, the school was then incorporated in 1928.

To set it apart from other secretarial schools of the era, the Gibbs school was marketed as selecting only women of a high socioeconomic status, making them highly appealing to young women from elite backgrounds. Gibbs distinguished her schools from her competitors, and she did so by offering courses in dressing appropriately, serving tea, and other social refinements.

The Gibbs schools promoted a message of female empowerment, while focusing on the type of education that would be most valuable to women at the time. The Gibbs schools promoted the ideas that secretarial training was the path to a career for women. Capitalizing on gender-based restrictions of the time, Gibbs created an educational empire.

=== Gibb's son takes over business ===
Katharine died in 1934 at the age of 71. Upon her death, her youngest son, James Gordon Gibbs, served as President and expanded the school to other cities, including Chicago in 1943 (it closed in 1954) and Montclair in 1950. He hired poet and Columbia professor Mark Van Doren to teach at the New York campus. Some women stayed at the Barbizon Hotel in Manhattan while taking their courses

Some notable graduates from the program were Jean Drewes, who worked for the Duke and Dutchess of Windsor. Actress Loretta Swit graduated in 1957 and Marilyn Monroe's New York makeup artist, Marie Irvine, were graduates who transitioned into the film industry. A 1942 graduate, Ethel Bent Walsh, became the first acting chairwoman of the Equal Employment Opportunities Commission.

=== Acquisition by Macmillan and other corporations ===
With the rise of feminism in the 1960s and 1970s secretarial schools began to fade. The decline of the Gibbs school as an elite option for women was the result of its own gender-based marketing tactics. In 1968, James Gordon Gibbs and they Gibbs family sold the schools to the Macmillan Inc., who worked to transition the schools' identity. James Gordon's wife, Blanche Gibbs, became president of the schools until 1970. In 1970, there was an incident at the New York campus where women's liberation activists rallied against the school. After being sold, it specialized in education in industries such as graphical design, business administration, computer technology, criminal justice, and medical assistants.

The school network continued to expand in the 1970s and 1980s to include seven additional locations in Long Island, NY (1971); 142 East Avenue in Norwalk, CT (1973); Philadelphia, PA (1977); Rockville, MD (1983); Valley Forge, PA (1983); Tysons, VA (1984); and Piscataway, NJ (1984). The schools also offered additional programing, such as hotel and restaurant management, computer network operation, and visual communication programs.

In 1989 Macmillan sold the school system to Phillips Colleges, Inc. who then resold them to K-III Communications Corporation in 1994. In 1997 the schools were bought by Career Education Corporation. The Career Education Corporation added new programs in graphic arts, visual communication, and animation and offered associate degree programs. In 1999, the New Jersey branch moved and became Gibbs College under the New Jersey Commission on Higher Education.

=== Closure ===
In the fall of 2006, the Illinois-based Career Education Corporation announced that the entire Gibbs College division was being put up for sale. In January 2007, the New York State Education Department reported deficiencies at the Katharine Gibbs New York campus. The problems related to faculty qualifications and remedial course offerings. New enrollment was limited and the Education Department stated it would close the college if improvements were not made.

Over the next year, no buyer could be found, so on Thursday, February 14, 2008, Career Education Corporation announced that it would convert three of the nine campuses in the Gibbs division (Boston, Massachusetts, Virginia, and Melville, New York) to its Sanford-Brown College brand and "teach out" the remaining schools in the division. Those seven campuses were scheduled to close in December 2009. Students were still being admitted into the Melville, New York, campus which had been reflagged as "SBI Campus, an affiliate of Sanford-Brown". It was announced in 2013 that the Virginia operation was being shut down.

Academic transcript requests are fulfilled through Parchment Exchange. Parchment Exchange manages processing and delivery; Career Education Corporation or the custodial school of records retains the official transcript data. The National Student Clearinghouse is an authorized agent for providing degree and enrollment verification.

== Former locations ==
Gibbs College locations:

- Cranston, Rhode Island - originally located in Providence, Rhode Island
- Tysons Corner, Virginia
- Livingston, New Jersey
- Boston, Massachusetts
- Norwalk, Connecticut

Katharine Gibbs School locations:

- New York City
- Norristown, Pennsylvania
- Philadelphia, Pennsylvania
- Montclair, New Jersey
- Piscataway Township, New Jersey
- Melville, New York
- Chicago, Illinois

== See also ==
- List of defunct colleges and universities in New York
