= Katharine Gibbs =

American entrepreneur

Katharine Gibbs (also Catharine Ryan, Katie Gibbs and Katherine Ryan) (1863–1934) was the founder of Katharine Gibbs Schools which became a for-profit institution of higher education.

Catharine Ryan was born in Galena, Illinois, on January 10, 1863, and was the granddaughter of Irish Catholic immigrants. Her father was a successful meat packing merchant who sent her to be educated by two spinsters from New England who provided her with a cultural education. She then graduated from the Manhattanville Convent of the Sacred Heart in New York City as part of its first class in 1882.

In 1891 her father died intestate and her two brothers squandered his estate. In 1896 Katharine visited her brothers in Helena, Montana, where she met and married William Gibbs, a Protestant watchmaker originally from Medford, Massachusetts. The couple eventually settled Edgewood, Cranston near Providence, Rhode Island and had two sons, William Howard Gibbs in 1898 and James Gordon Gibbs in 1900. William Gibbs died in 1909 in a boating accident at the Edgewood Yacht Club in Cranston, Rhode Island near their home.

In 1910 Gibbs' sister, Mary Ryan, enrolled in the Providence School for Secretaries in Providence, Rhode Island and became an assistant teacher at the school. The school's owner asked Mary if she would like to purchase the school, and Mary and Katharine decided to purchase it together for $1,000 with Mary teaching and Katharine serving as an administrator. They changed the curriculum to focus on secretarial training rather than stenography and experienced great expansion at the time of World War I when many men left jobs to fight in the War. Gibbs expanded the schools to create a branch near every major Ivy League university, expanding to Boston by 1917 and to New York by 1918. After her death in 1934, Katharine's youngest son, Gordon Gibbs, served as President and expanded the school to other cities.

Gibbs was inducted into the Rhode Island Heritage Hall of Fame in 1983.
