= Zippo =

American manufacturer of lighters

Zippo Manufacturing Company
- Type: Private
- Industry: Manufacturing
- Founded: 1932; 94 years ago
- Founder: George Grant Blaisdell
- Headquarters: Bradford, Pennsylvania, United States
- Products: Lighters and accessories
- Website: zippo.com

A Zippo lighter is a reusable metal lighter produced by Zippo Manufacturing Company of Bradford, Pennsylvania, United States. Thousands of different styles and designs have been made since their introduction in 1933, including military versions for specific regiments. Zippo lighters have been sold worldwide and described as "a legendary and distinct symbol of America". In 2012, the company produced the 500-millionth unit. Since the company's inception in 1932, Zippo lighters have been primarily manufactured in the United States, although the company operated in Niagara Falls, Ontario, Canada, from 1949 until 2002.

== Company history ==
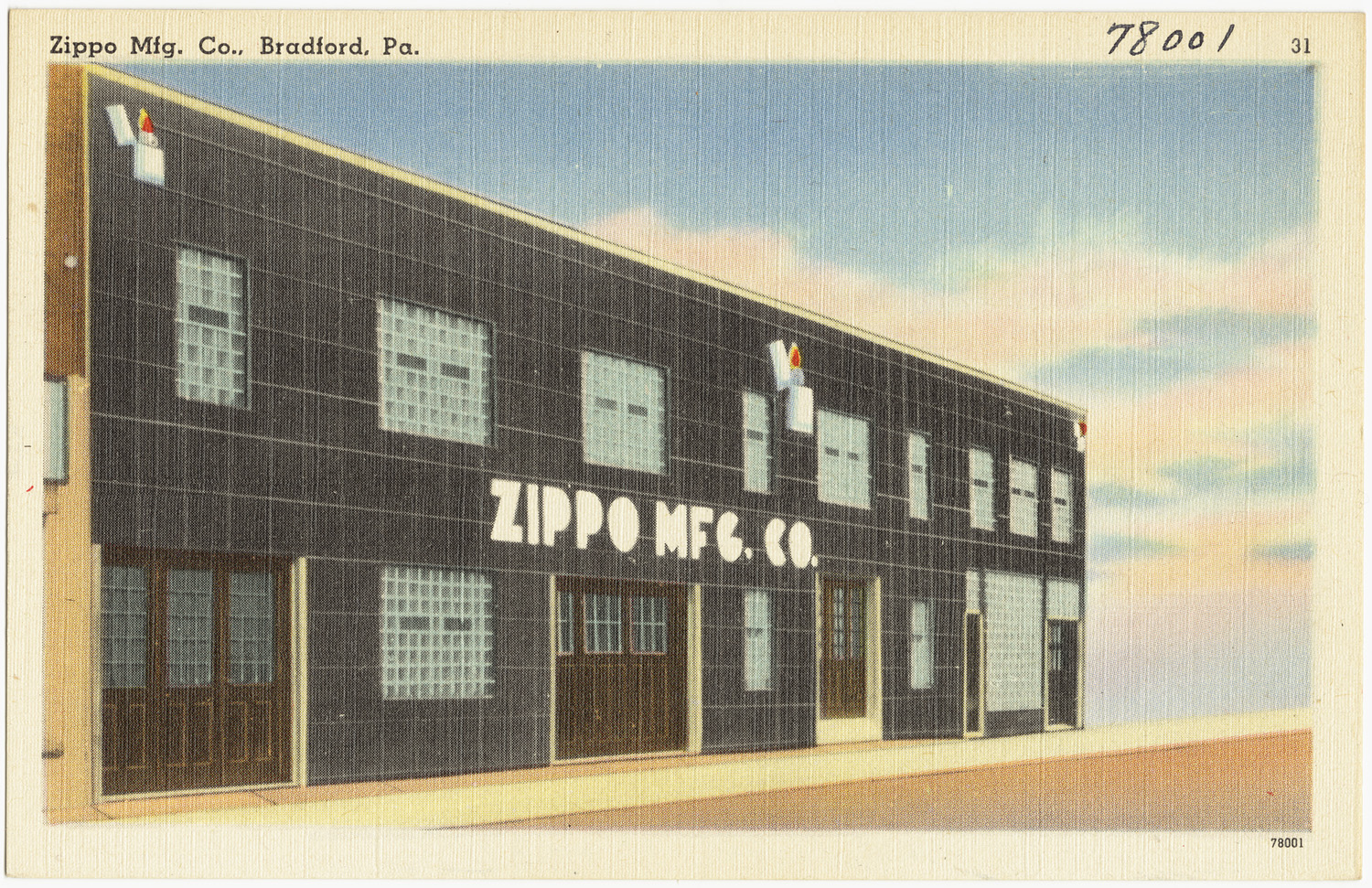
Zippo plant, c. 1930–1945

American inventor George G. Blaisdell founded Zippo Manufacturing Company in 1932 and produced the first Zippo lighter in early 1933, being inspired by an Austrian cigarette lighter of similar design made by IMCO. It got its name because Blaisdell liked the sound of the word "zipper," and "zippo" sounded more modern. On March 3, 1936, the U.S. Patent Office granted a patent for the Zippo lighter.

Zippo lighters became popular in the United States military, especially during World War II—when, as the company's web site says, Zippo "ceased production of lighters for consumer markets and dedicated all manufacturing to the US military". The U.S. war correspondent Ernie Pyle wrote a letter to the Zippo founder commenting that "Zippo is probably the most important element on the front." Period Zippos were made of brass, but Zippo used a black crackle finished steel during the war years because of metal shortages. While Zippo Manufacturing Company never had an official contract with the military, individual armed forces personnel requested that base exchange (BX) and post exchange (PX) stores carry this sought-after lighter. While it had previously been common to have Zippos with authorized badges, unit emblems, and division insignias, it became popular among the American soldiers of the Vietnam War to get their Zippos engraved with personal mottos. These lighters are now sought-after collector's items and popular souvenirs for visitors to Vietnam.

After World War II, the Zippo lighter became increasingly used in advertising by companies large and small through the 1960s. Much of the early Zippo lighter advertising are works of art painted by hand, and as technology has evolved, so has the design and finish of the Zippo lighter. The basic mechanism of the Zippo lighter has remained unchanged, but they developed into a popular fashion accessory, with a huge variety of artistic designs produced.

In 2002, Zippo expanded its product line to include a variety of utility-style multi-purpose lighters, known as Zippo MPLs. This was followed in 2005 with the Outdoor Utility Lighter, known as the OUL. These lighters are fueled with butane. In August 2007, Zippo released a new butane lighter called the Zippo BLU. It discontinued the line January 1, 2016.

A museum called "Zippo/Case visitors center" is located in Bradford, Pennsylvania, at 1932 Zippo Drive. This 15,000-square-foot (1,400 m^{2}) building contains rare and custom made Zippo lighters, and also sells the entire Zippo line. The museum was featured on the NPR program Weekend Edition on Sunday, January 25, 2009. The museum also contains an enormous collection of Case knives. Since the Zippo company's 60th anniversary in 1992, annual editions have been produced for Zippo collectors.

In 2009, Zippo announced plans to purchase Ronson Consumer Products Corporation, a long-time competitor in the lighter market. On February 3, 2010, the deal was finalized.

In March 2011, due to significant decrease of sales from 18 million lighters a year in the mid-1990s to about 12 million lighters a year recently, combined with increasing pressure on people not to smoke, Zippo Manufacturing Co. tried offering a wider variety of products using the Zippo name, such as watches, clothing and cologne. This strategy is similar to the success Victorinox Swiss Army Brands Inc. has had selling watches, luggage, clothing, and fragrance.

On June 5, 2012, the company manufactured its 500,000,000th lighter and celebrated its 80th anniversary. In 2018, Zippo announced the sound trademark of its windproof lighter, making the Zippo lighter's click officially one of the most recognised sounds in the world.

On June 3, 2020, the company manufactured its 600,000,000th lighter.

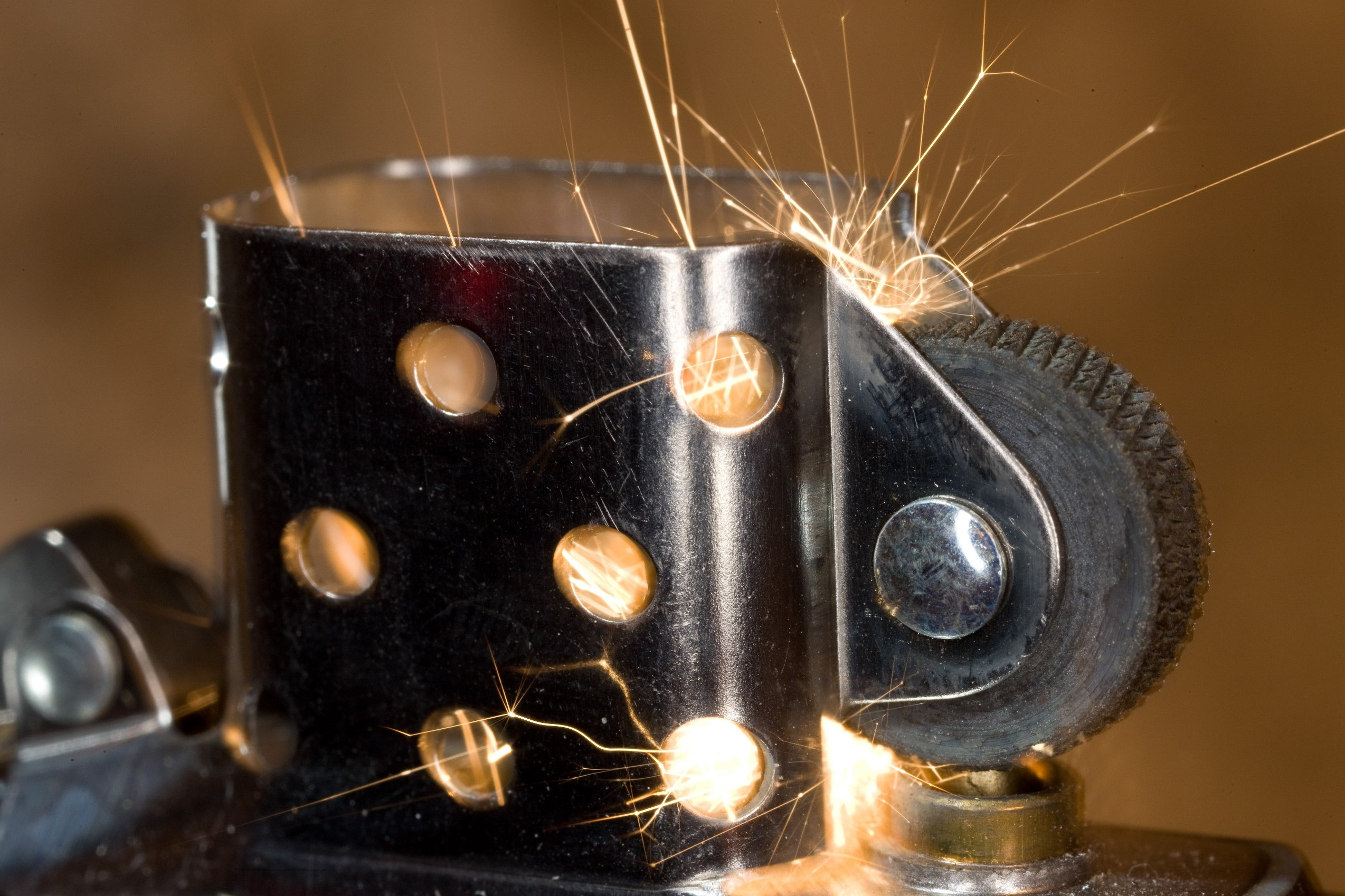
Zippo's flint-wheel Ignition

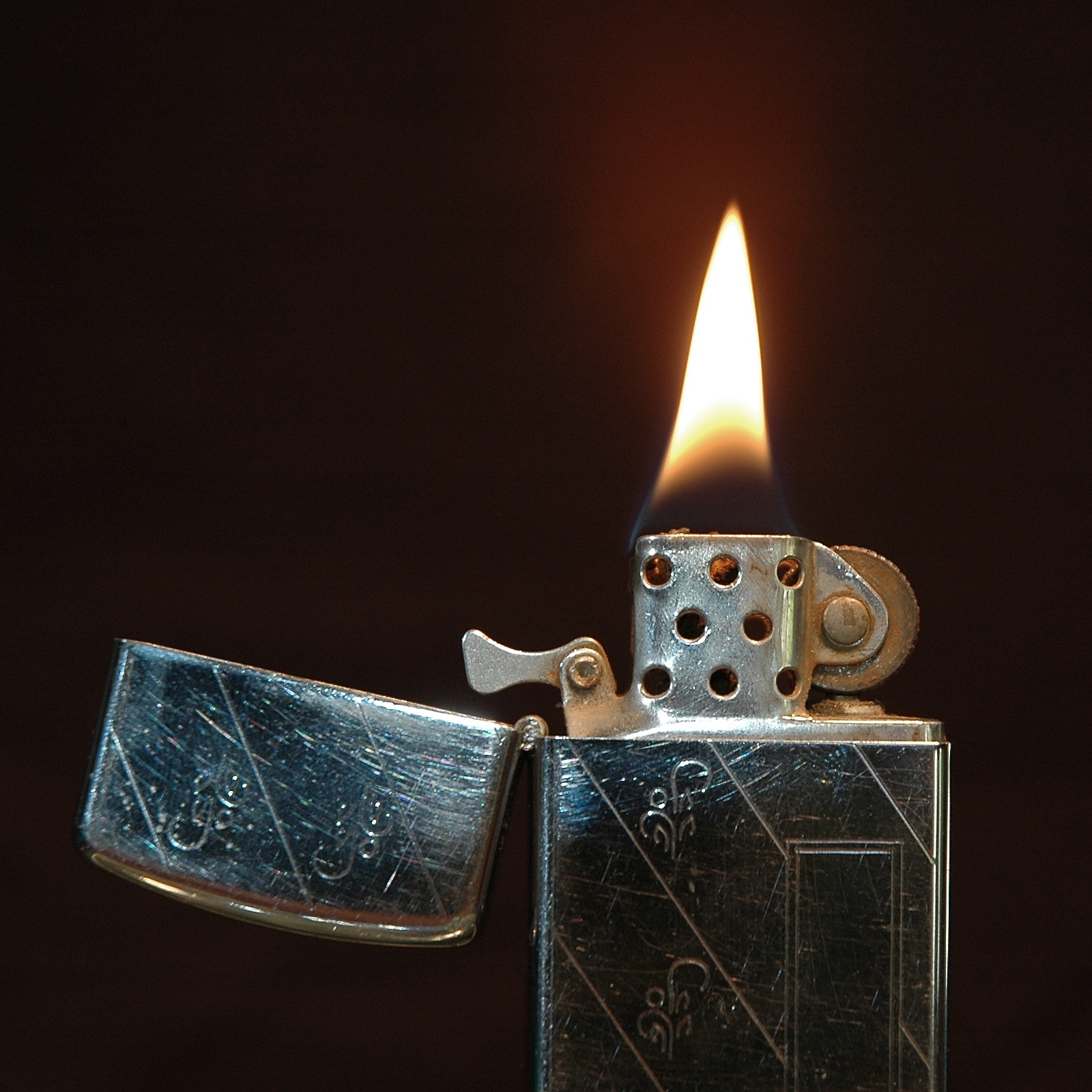
A lit 1968 slim model Zippo

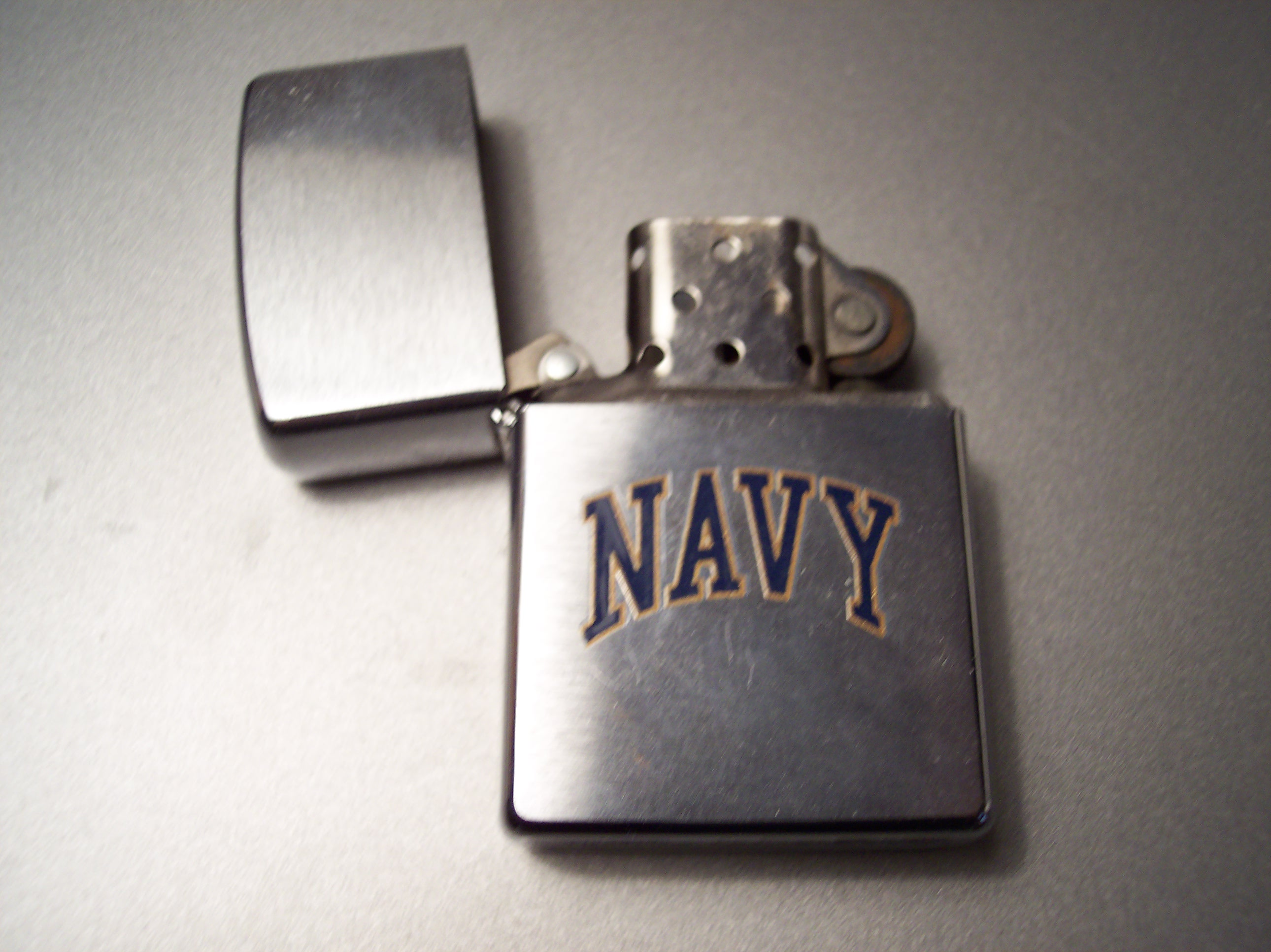
An open full-size Navy Zippo

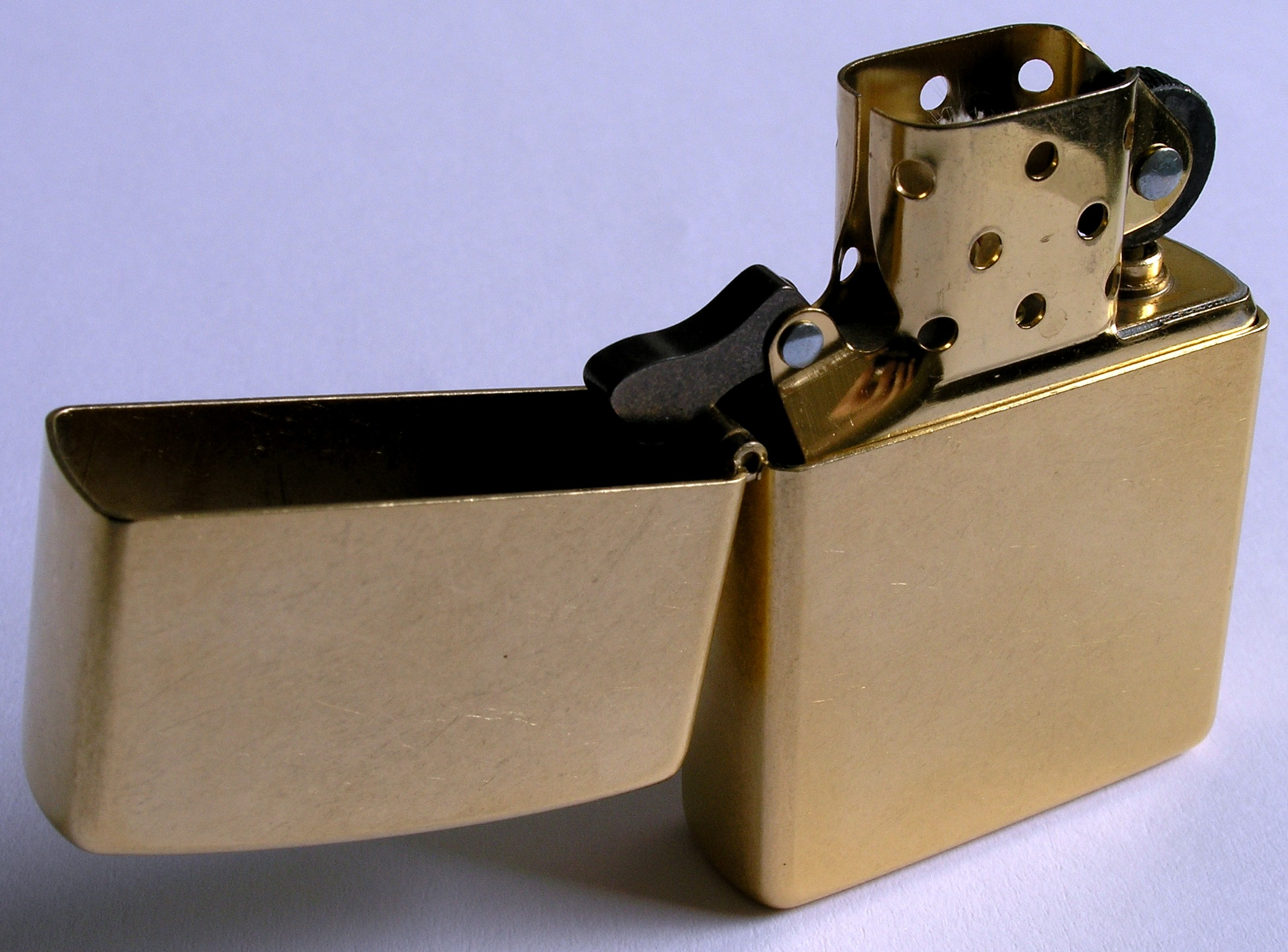
Brass-based case design with matched insert coloring

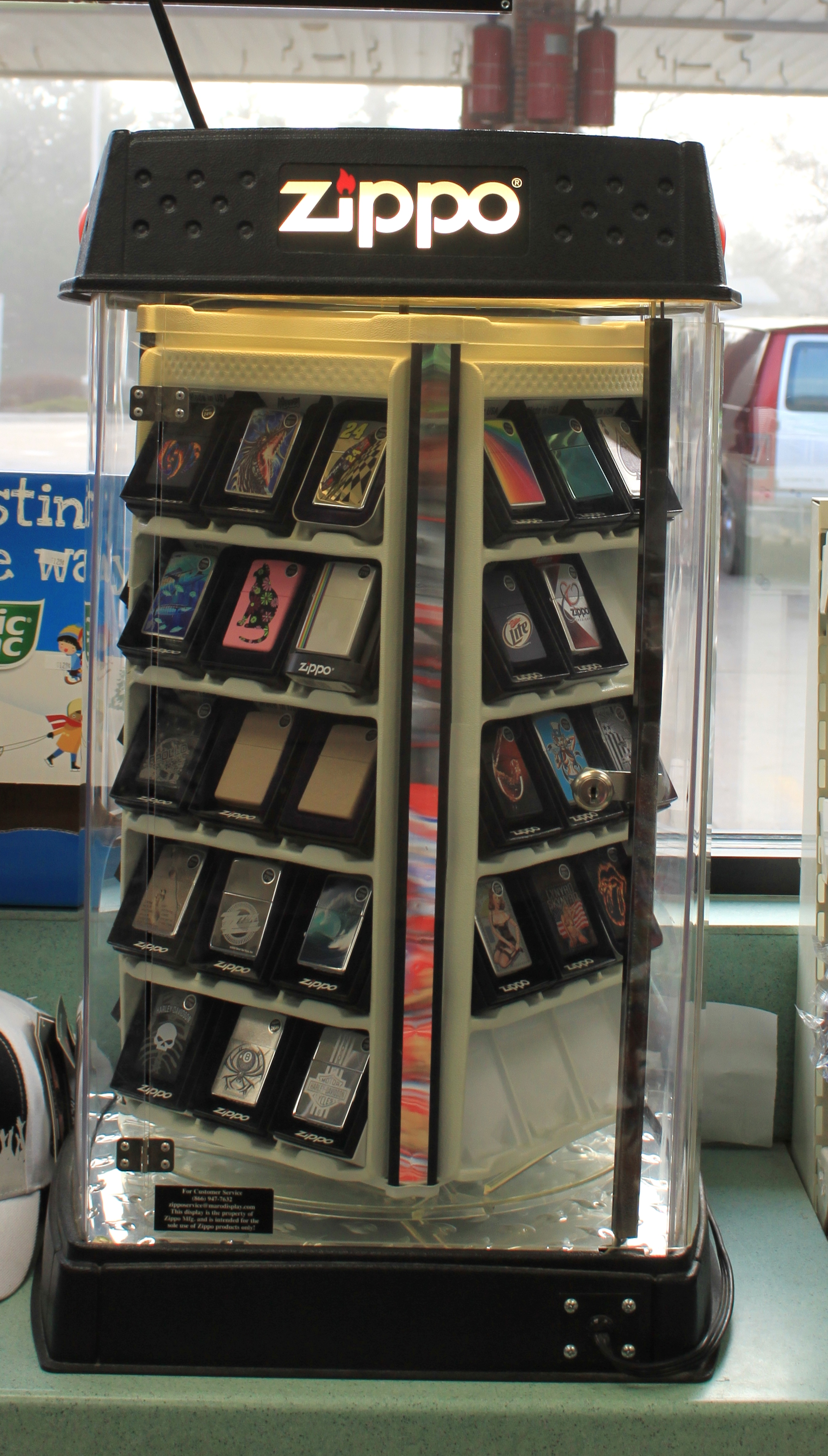
Zippo point of sale display

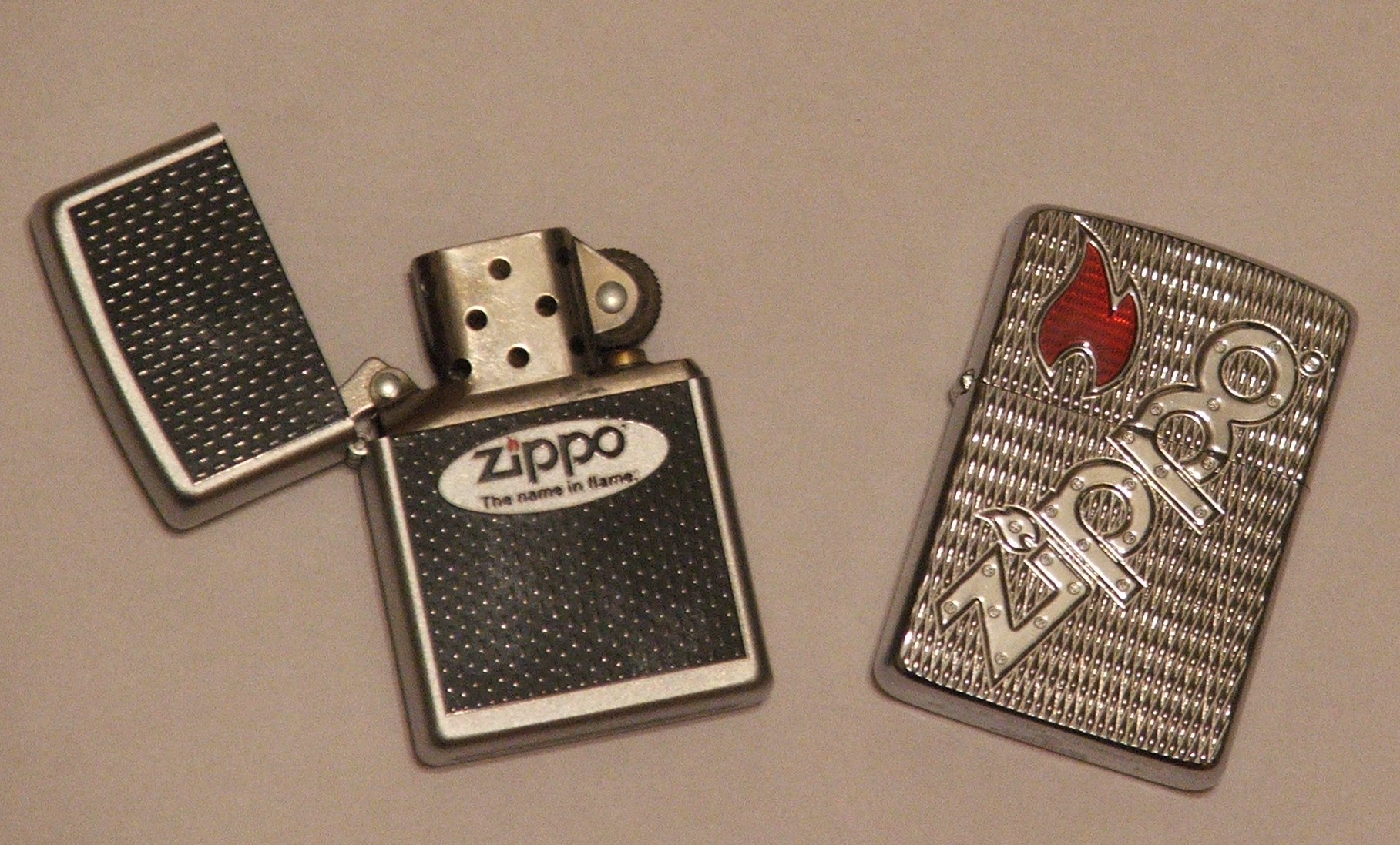
Two Zippo lighters, one open, one closed

== Usage ==
Zippo lighters, which have gained popularity as “windproof” lighters, are able to stay lit in harsh weather, due to the design of the windscreen and adequate rate of fuel delivery.

A consequence of the windproofing is that it is hard to extinguish a Zippo by blowing out the flame. However, if the flame is blown from the top down, it will be easily extinguished. The proper way to extinguish the lighter is to close the top half, which starves the flame of oxygen, but unlike other lighters, this does not cut off the fuel supply. One of the recognizable features of Zippo is the fact that it burns with a wick. Opening the top lid produces an easily recognizable "clink" sound for which Zippo lighters are known, and a different but similarly recognizable "clunk" when the lighter is closed. This noise is produced by the spring-loaded toggling cam, a small lever that keeps the lid closed or opened securely.

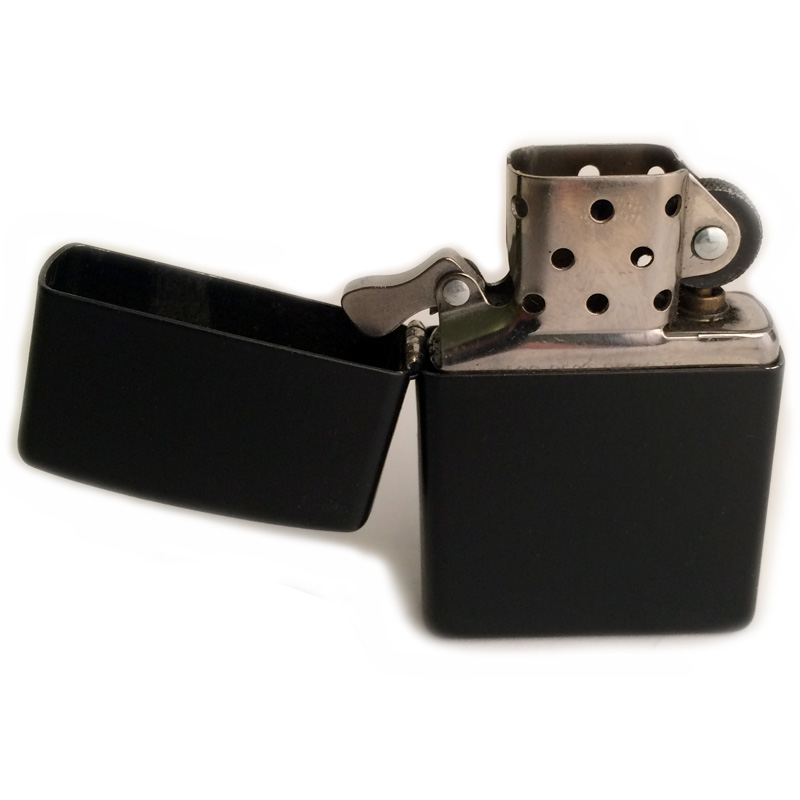
Modern black matte finish Zippo lighter

Unlike disposable lighters, newly purchased Zippo lighters do not contain fuel. Instructions for safely fueling the Zippo are included in its packaging. Zippo also sell a name-brand lighter fluid.

=== Vietnam War ===
Morley Safer, in his August 5, 1965 CBS News report of the Cam Ne incident and Private First Class Reginald "Malik" Edwards, the rifleman with the 9th Regiment, US Marine Corps Danang (June 1965 – March 1966) whose profile comprises chapter one of Wallace Terry's book, Bloods: An Oral History of the Vietnam War by Black Veterans (1984), describe the use of Zippo lighters in search and destroy missions during the Vietnam War. Edwards stated: "when you say level a village, you don't use torches. It's not like in the 1800s. You used a Zippo. Now you would use a Bic. That's just the way we did it. You went in there with your Zippos. Everybody. That's why people bought Zippos. Everybody had a Zippo. It was for burnin' shit down."

"Zippo squad" became a phrase of American military jargon for being assigned to burn a village. The M132 armored flamethrower was referred to as a "Zippo". The same is the case with the M67 flame thrower tank.

== Price ==
As of March 2022, Zippos carry a suggested retail price between US$17.95 and US$25,000 (for the Armor 18k solid gold model). In 2001, according to the fall 2003 issue of IUP Magazine, a 1933 model was purchased for $18,000 at a swap meet in Tokyo, and in 2002 the company bought one valued at $12,000 for its own collection. During the 75th anniversary celebrations in 2007, Zippo sold a near mint 1933 model for $37,000.

All Zippo windproof lighters carry an unlimited lifetime guarantee, promoted using the trademarked phrase "It works or we fix it free." The corporate web site claims: "in almost 75 years, no one has ever spent a cent on the mechanical repair of a Zippo lighter regardless of the lighter's age or condition."

== Date codes ==
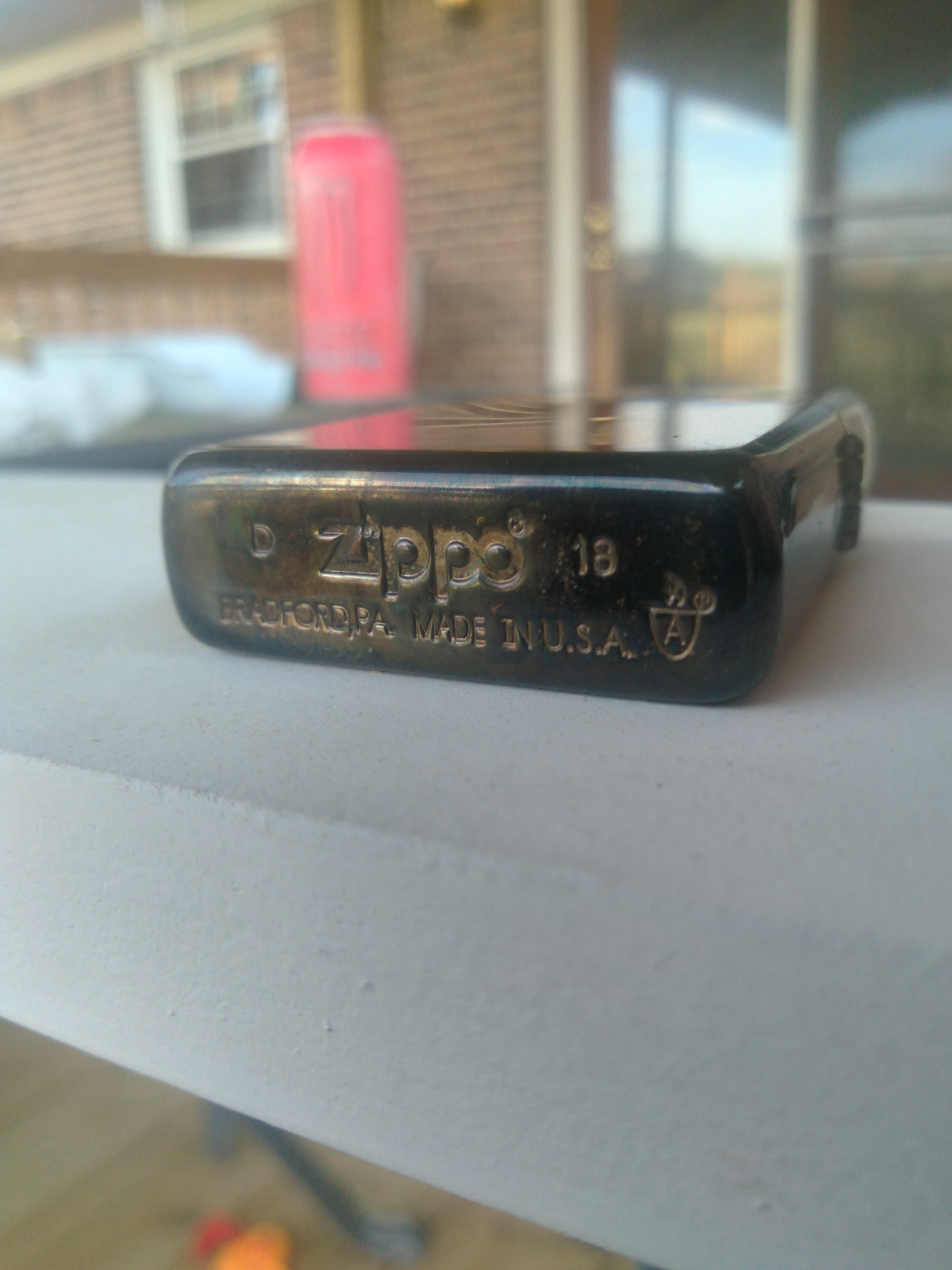
Date code of a Zippo made in April 2018

In mid-1955, Zippo started year coding its lighters by the use of dots. From 1966 until 1973, the year code was denoted by combinations of vertical lines. From 1974 until 1981 the coding comprised combinations of forward slashes. In 1979, the company inadvertently introduced an error into fabrication, with some lighters reading / on the left and // on the right instead of // on the left and / on the right, but corrected the problem within the year. From 1982 until June 1986 the coding was by backslash.

After July 1986, Zippo began including a date code on all lighters showing the month and year of production. On the left of the underside was stamped a letter A–L, denoting the month (A = January, B = February, C = March, etc.). On the right was a Roman numeral which denoted the year, beginning with II in 1986. However, in 2001, Zippo altered this system, changing the Roman numerals to Arabic numerals. Thus a Zippo made in August 2004 was stamped H 04.

== Construction ==
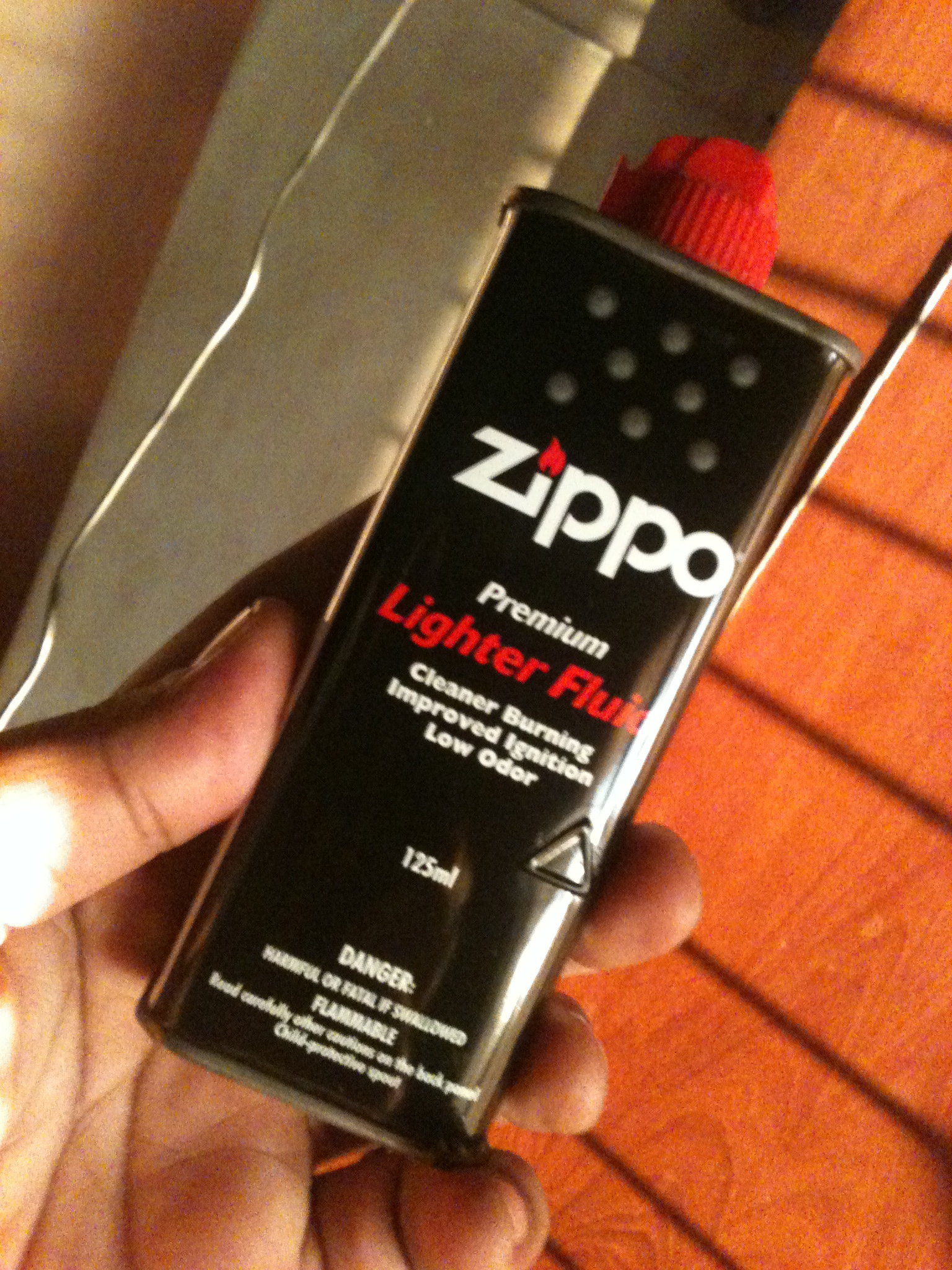
Zippo lighter fluid can

The cases of Zippo lighters are typically made of brass and are rectangular with a hinged top. On most models, the top of the case is slightly convex.

Inside the case are the works of the lighter. The insert contains the spring-toggle lever that keeps the top closed, the wick, windscreen chimney, flintwheel, and flint, all of which are mounted on an open-bottom metal box that is slightly smaller than the bottom of the outer case, and into which it slips snugly.

The hollow part of the interior box encloses five rayon balls (similar to cotton balls) which are in contact with the wick. The bottom of this is covered by a piece of felt approximately 1/4 of an inch thick. Printed on the bottom of the felt (in modern Zippos, not on older models prior to late 1992) are the words, "LIFT TO FILL," to indicate one must lift the felt away from the "cotton" in order to refuel it. The fuel, light petroleum distillate or synthetic isoparaffinic hydrocarbon (commonly referred to as lighter fluid or naphtha), is poured into the rayon balls (sometimes called the "cotton," or the "batting"), which absorbs it. It also contains a tube that holds a short, cylindrical flint. The tube has an interior spring and exterior cap-screw that keeps the flint in constant contact with the exterior flint-wheel. Spinning this rough-surfaced wheel against flint results in a spark that ignites the fluid in the wick.

All parts of the lighter are replaceable. The Zippo lighter requires 108 manufacturing operations.

== Zippo BLU and Zippo BLU 2 ==
Zippo released the Zippo BLU in 2007 (although there are many 2005 pre-release models). These are butane torch lighters, which Zippo has gone to great lengths to make sure are still "identifiable as a Zippo". Specifically, the lid and cam were "tuned" so that the lighter still makes the distinctive "Zippo click", and also it is one of the few butane torch lighters to use a flint and striker wheel. The company also marketed the BLU2, which features a squarer frame and eliminates the fuel gauge on the side of the original Zippo BLU.

On January 1, 2016, Zippo discontinued production of the BLU line of lighters and sold the BLU trademark to Lorillard, but continued to service all Zippo BLU lighters.

== Zippo subsidiaries ==
In addition to its 2010 purchase of the Ronson brand in the US and Canada, Zippo also owns W. R. Case & Sons Cutlery Co. of Bradford, Pennsylvania, Zippo UK, Ltd. of London, England, and Zippo Fashion Italia of Vicenza, Italy.

== See also ==
- Zippo Mfg. Co. v. Zippo Dot Com, Inc.
