= Evan O'Neill Kane =

American surgeon (1861–1932)

- Born: April 6, 1861; Darby, Pennsylvania, US
- Died: April 1, 1932 (aged 70); Kane, Pennsylvania, US
- Education: Jefferson Medical College
- Occupation: Surgeon
- Known for: Self-surgery

Evan O'Neill Kane (April 6, 1861 – April 1, 1932) was an American physician and surgeon from the 1880s to the early 1930s who served as chief of surgery at Kane Summit Hospital in Kane, Pennsylvania. He was a significant contributor in his day to railway surgery, that is, medical and managerial practices directed toward occupational health and accident-related trauma surgery for railroad workers. Kane was also a well published contributor of innovations in surgical procedures and equipment, including asbestos bandages, mica windows for brain surgery, and multiple site hypodermoclysis.

Kane was convinced that particular surgeries need not involve general anesthesia. He is most well known, both in his own time and since, for demonstrating this by performing self-surgery in 1921 to remove his own appendix under local anesthetic. In 1932 at age 70, he very publicly again performed self-surgery to repair a hernia. Some of Kane’s practices were idiosyncratic. For instance, he left a small inked, coded signature beside the incisions of some of his surgical patients. He also proposed tattooing mothers and newborn babies with matching marks to avoid accidental mix ups.

Kane was a member of a Pennsylvania family that included several physicians (including his mother) that had earlier given its name to both their community and his primary hospital of practice; their family home, Anoatok, is on the National Register of Historic Places. Kane was also in the public eye in 1931 when he testified at the sensational trial of his son Elisha Kent Kane III, a college professor, who was acquitted of murder in Elizabeth City County, Virginia after the drowning death of his wife during their trip to a Back River Light beach.

== Family and home ==
Kane's father was the American Civil War Major General Thomas L. Kane, who was also the founder of the town Kane, Pennsylvania and a prominent abolitionist. Thomas L. Kane also played a role in preventing war with the Mormons through his friendship with Brigham Young. Kane's mother, Elizabeth Denniston Wood Kane, was a practicing physician (until 1909) as was his brother, William (also called Thomas L. Kane Jr., b. 1863), and his sister, Harriet Amelia (1855–1896). Kane also had an elder brother, Elisha Kent Kane (b. 1856), an engineering graduate from Princeton.

Kane married his first wife Blanche Rupert on May 28, 1893, but she died less than a year later, two weeks after giving birth to their son Elisha Kent Kane (b. March 18, 1894).

He then married Lila Rupert on June 1, 1897. He had a further six children with Lila:

- William Wood Kane (b. May 7, 1898)
- Blanche Rupert Kane (b. August 9, 1899)
- Bernard Evan Kane (b. February 18, 1902)
- Thomas Leiper Kane (b. August 3, 1903)
- Twins Robert Livingston Kane and Schuyler Kane (b. August 29, 1904).

Kane's son, Elisha Kent Kane, was head of the Romance language department at the University of Tennessee. Elisha was charged with murdering his wife, Jenny G. Kane (1898–1931) by drowning, at a beach on Chesapeake Bay. The trial was a sensation at the time: crowds of people gathered outside the courthouse, unable to find room inside. Evan Kane was instrumental in obtaining his son's acquittal by presenting medical evidence at his trial. He established that Jenny had a heart condition that contributed to her drowning. Elisha resigned his position with the university after his trial. A book by Ann Davis, a local historian, gives a fictionalized account of these events.

Kane's son Thomas Leiper Kane was the father of Evan O'Neill Kane, who was prominent in the development of the band theory of semiconductors, which are now the basic building blocks of modern electronics.

The arctic explorer Elisha Kent Kane is related (he is Evan Kane's uncle), but is a different person from both Evan Kane's son and his brother of the same name.

Kane lived in the family home Anoatok, which is now listed on the National Register of Historic Places. Anoatok was built by Kane's mother to house herself, Evan O'Neill Kane and another son, Thomas L. Kane, and their families after the original family home burned down in 1896. The architect was Walter Cope who had married into the Kane family – to a cousin of Major General Kane. The name Anoatok, an Eskimo word, honours Elisha Kent Kane the arctic explorer. Elizabeth died in 1909 and Thomas moved his family out in 1910 into a new home also designed by Walter Cope, leaving Evan O'Neill Kane and his family as the sole occupants. Anoatok remained Kane's home and office until his death.

Kane died of pneumonia at the age of 70 in 1932, shortly after the trial of his son and just a few months after his major hernia operation.

== Kane Summit Hospital ==
In 1887, Elizabeth Kane together with two of her sons, Evan and William, founded the Woodside Cottage Hospital in Kane. The concept of a cottage hospital originated with Major General Kane, who thought that wounds healed better "in the Kane air", but he died in 1883, some years before Elizabeth founded the hospital. Around 1892 the hospital, together with its patients, was moved to a larger site, built on land donated by Elizabeth Kane, and was thereafter known as Kane Summit Hospital. Evan graduated from Jefferson Medical College, Philadelphia in 1884. He practiced as a physician in Kane and later became chief surgeon of the Kane Summit Hospital, a position he held at the time of his own appendectomy operation. He died at his own hospital in 1932. The facility ceased work as a hospital in 1970, but the building is still used by Kane Community Hospital for administration.

Kane Summit Hospital, as a public hospital, received charitable grants from the State of Pennsylvania. The tight family control of the hospital led to complaints from local physicians, who claimed that they were not able to freely use the hospital. Patients were admitted on condition that Evan O'Neill Kane, as the chief surgeon, had the final say in their treatment. The complaining physicians felt that they alone should be the judge of the proper treatment of their own patients and found this condition unacceptable. In February 1908, formal complaints to the Pennsylvania Board of Charity Commissioners resulted in an investigation. The complainants were requesting that the Hospital grant should be withdrawn so this was a serious matter for the hospital, but both Evan and his assistant Thomas L. Kane were away in Florida at the time. Answering the charges fell to their brother Elisha Kent Kane, who was on the board of management of the hospital, but not the medical staff, and the hospital superintendent M. J. Hays. The hospital admission rules were changed as a result of the investigation. The commissioners found that the Kanes were not using their position to make unacceptable profits from the hospital; on the contrary, they had made large donations, but recommended that stock holding in the hospital should be more broadly extended outside the Kane family. The commissioners also requested that the private practice offices of Evan and Thomas Kane be moved outside the hospital. Although the furnishing of these offices were paid for by the occupants, the cost of fuel, water and lighting was borne by the hospital.

== Railway surgery ==
Kane was a railway surgeon for five different railroads. In Kane's time, railway surgery was markedly different from surgery in a hospital and was considered to be its own field. Surgeons frequently needed to operate at great distances from a proper hospital facility, often in dirty and unsanitary conditions, and operations were performed with only basic equipment and materials. Industrial accidents on the railways resulted in many crushing injuries. A large proportion of the estimated 1,000 operations Kane performed in the three years from 1898 to 1900 were treatment for accidents on the railways, many of which were laparotomies. Several of Kane's medical innovations were intended to be aids to the surgeon in the field, and clearly inspired by his work as a railway surgeon.

== Innovations and inventions ==
Kane played music with a phonograph in the operating theatre prior to anaesthetizing the patient, believing it had a calming effect on his patients more effective than conversation (as the surgeon was often distracted and conversations with assistants often dwindled), thus making Kane responsible for one of the first uses of music as a medical therapy. Studies have since shown that music can help reduce pain following an operation, and consequently also reduces the need for pain-killing drugs.

Kane invented an improvement to the Murphy button, a device then commonly used for intestinal anastomosis, but now usually done with a surgical stapler. Kane was seeking a device with a larger aperture and less possibility of blockage after losing a patient to whom he had fitted a Murphy button.

Kane presented a paper to the American Academy of Railway Surgeons in 1900 addressing the difficulty of administering intravenous infusions in the field. Kane lists among the difficulties the unsterilized conditions and the tendency of veins to collapse following haemorrhage. Kane's solution was a device which could administer multiple instances of hypodermoclyses simultaneously. Kane's device could have up to ten needles, but Kane never used this many, as four were normally sufficient. Normal hypodermoclysis would be too slow in emergency conditions, but Kane's invention speeded up the rate of fluid replacement many times. Kane's device was subsequently criticised for its use of an unsealed rubber bulb by Edwin Hasbrouck, who proposed an alternative improved design. Administering hypodermoclysis at two sites for faster fluid uptake is a technique still in use today.

Kane had some novel ideas on materials for use in surgery. Influenced by his work in railway surgery, he was particularly concerned with materials that were good for use in the field and sometimes advocated the use of supplies that could be obtained locally from hardware stores and similar suppliers. He made his own bandages from woven asbestos, a material readily available at the time. Sterilising dressings, and keeping them sterilised, was a problem in the field. Unlike modern dressings—which are supplied in sealed, sterile packs—the dressings of the time had to be sterilised immediately before use. In an emergency situation there may be little time to do this. The use of fire-proof bandages allowed them to be sterilised quickly in an open fire. In 1924, Kane proposed the use of mica to repair head wounds that had exposed and damaged the brain. He cited among the advantages of this that it provided a window for the physician to observe the damage and that in an emergency in the field, mica could be obtained by removing it from a stove window, an application for which it was commonly used at the time.

Another of Kane's innovations for use in the field was an acetylene lamp worn on the head by the surgeon. This was intended for operations carried out in the field at night. Kane says it was particularly useful for illuminating the abdominal cavity.

Kane advocated, and practiced, tattooing newborn infants (in an inconspicuous place) with an identifying mark matching an identical tattoo on the mother. Kane was aware of cases where claims had been made of babies being mixed up and wished to avoid any possibility of this occurring in his hospital. In Kane's view, complex clerical systems designed to prevent errors that might be implemented in a large hospital were impracticable in a small hospital because the administrative staff to run it were simply not available. Kane also argued that it was impossible to positively prove that a mistake had not been made with a purely clerical system.

== Self-surgery ==
Kane had a history of operating on himself. In 1919 he self-amputated one of his own fingers that had become infected. But it was the operation of removing his own appendix under local anaesthetic, performed on 15 February 1921 at the age of 60, which brought him wider media attention. He is believed to have been the first to have undertaken this self-operation. Kane did this, in part, to experience the procedure from the patient's perspective. He had in mind using local anaesthesia in future on patients with medical conditions that prevented a general anaesthetic being administered, and wanted to ensure that the procedure could be tolerated by the patient. Kane believed ether (the usual general anaesthetic of the time) was used too often and was more dangerous than local anaesthetics. The anaesthetic used by Kane was novocaine, a fairly recent replacement for the more dangerous cocaine. Kane performed the operation, which he had carried out nearly 4,000 times on others, with the aid of mirrors that enabled him to see the work area. At this time the operation was rather more major than today, as the incision to remove an appendix was much larger than that needed for modern keyhole surgery techniques. Nevertheless, Kane was well enough to be taken home the following day.

This operation by Kane was not only a sensation at the time—it continued to be reported for many years afterwards. For instance, Popular Science discusses it in 1933 in an article on anaesthesia.

On another occasion, in 1932 at the age of 70, Kane repaired his own inguinal hernia under local anaesthetic. The hernia had been caused by a horse riding accident six years earlier. The operation was carried out at the Kane Summit Hospital with the press, including a photographer, in attendance. This operation is more dangerous than the earlier appendectomy because of the risk of puncturing the femoral artery. The operation lasted one hour and 55 minutes. Kane was back in the operating theatre working 36 hours later.

In the latter part of his career, Kane had started signing his handiwork by tattooing on his patients the letter "K" in morse code ( ▄▄▄ ▄ ▄▄▄ ) using India ink. However, during his hernia operation he became too drowsy to finish the stitching up so this task and the tattooing fell to Howard Cleveland (who later became Chief Surgeon in 1938).

== Alcohol ==
Kane was opposed to the consumption of alcohol. Alcohol had been previously widely used as a treatment in medicine, but Kane believed that this was neither necessary nor desirable. He also spoke out against a suggestion that the sale of spirits should be reintroduced in army bases. Alcohol had ceased to be available to soldiers on base when, in a prelude to prohibition, the army canteens were abolished in 1901. For many years Richard Bartholdt attempted to introduce a bill reversing this decision and his efforts were supported by a petition of 279 physicians. In a letter to JAMA in 1912, Kane railed against this with "If our soldiers cannot find agreeable amusement without booze to make it attractive it is time that a determined effort to refine their depraved taste be made by the officers, who have plenty of spare time on their hands".

== Publications ==
- "Fire-proof asbestos dressing", Journal of the American Medical Association, vol.25, no.23, pp. 996–997, 7 December 1895.
- "Cure of prostatic hypertrophy by internal pressure", Journal of the American Medical Association, vol.26, no.11, pp. 521–522, 14 March 1896.
- "A new apparatus for fracture of the clavicle", Journal of the American Medical Association, vol.27, no.11, pp. 596–597, 12 September 1896.
- "Syphilis and drunkenness", Journal of the American Medical Association, vol.28, no.20, pp. 951–952, 15 May 1897.
- "Simple device for rapid hypodermoclysis in combating shock", Journal of the American Medical Association, vol.34, no.9, pp. 520–521, 3 March 1900.
- "A new coupler for rapid intestinal anastomosis", Journal of the American Medical Association, vol.38, no.16, pp. 1003–1005, 19 April 1902.
- "Pin in appendix", Journal of the American Medical Association, vol.43, no.3, p. 199, 16 July 1904.
- "Acetylene headlight and reflector for night operating", Journal of the American Medical Association, vol.43, no.17, p. 1231, 22 October 1904.
- "Cardiac dilation and displacement due to pleurisy", Journal of the American Medical Association, vol.57, no.10, pp. 792–793, 2 September 1911.
- "Peculiar twin ectopic gestation", Journal of the American Medical Association, vol.58, no.7, p. 475, 17 February 1912.
- "Phonograph in operating-room", Journal of the American Medical Association, vol.62, no.23, p. 1829, 6 June 1914.
- "Railway and army surgery – a comparison", International Journal of Surgery, vol.29, p. 390, December 1916.
- "Radium therapy", Radium, vol.7, no.1, pp. 16–20, April 1916.
- "Absorbable metal clips as substitutes for ligatures and deep sutures in wound closure", Journal of the American Medical Association, vol.69, no.8, pp. 663–664, 24 May 1917.
- "The injury to cancer patients of securing specimens prior to operation", Journal of the American Medical Association, vol.72, no.13, p. 955, 29 March 1919.
- "Autoappendectomy: a case history", International Journal of Surgery, vol.34, iss.3, pp. 100–102, March 1921.
- Is the Practice of Medicine Worth While?, Harrisburg, Pa: Medical Society of the State of Pennsylvania, 1921 OCLC 30681219.
- "Sheet mica in brain surgery", Journal of the American Medical Association, vol.82, no.21, p. 1714, 24 May 1924.
