= Elizabeth Kane =

American physician, writer and philanthropist

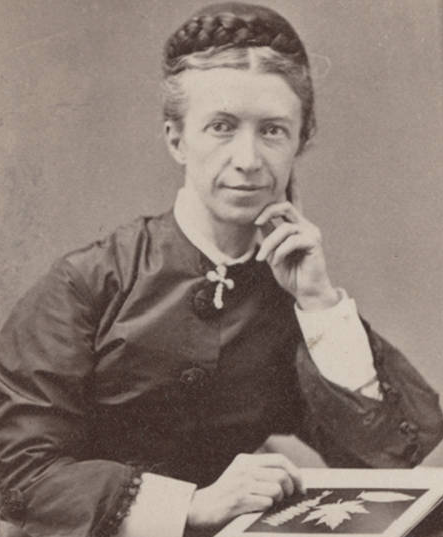
- Kane in Salt Lake City, c. 1872
- Born: Elizabeth Dennistoun Wood; May 12, 1836; Liverpool, England
- Died: May 25, 1909 (aged 73); Kane Anatoak Manor, Kane, Pennsylvania
- Education: Female Medical College of Pennsylvania
- Occupation: physician
- Spouse: Thomas L. Kane (after 1853)
- Children: 4, including Evan O'Neill Kane
- Parent(s): William Wood; Harriet Amelia Kane

Elizabeth Dennistoun Wood Kane (May 12, 1836 – May 25, 1909) was an American physician, writer, philanthropist, and women's rights activist. She was one of the first students to attend the Female Medical College of Pennsylvania. Her writing supported the part her husband, Thomas Kane, played in the lobbying efforts that attempted to prevent the Poland Bill from persecuting members of the Church of Jesus Christ of Latter-day Saints, who then practiced plural marriage.

She wrote two travel accounts, Twelve Mormon Homes Visited in Succession on a Journey through Utah to Arizona and A Gentile Account of Life in Utah's Dixie, published from her letters to home and her personal diaries that recounted the time that she spent in Utah with Thomas Kane associating with the Mormons. While the books may have influenced congressional debate about the Poland Bill, they more importantly represent a close first-person account of Mormons in the mid-late 1880s and reveal their lifestyles and opinions about polygamous practices.

== Early life ==
Elizabeth Dennistoun Wood was born on May 12, 1836, in Liverpool, England, in a suburb called Bootle. She was the third of six children of William Wood and Harriet Amelia Kane (first cousin of Thomas Kane's father). William was Scottish and Harriet was American; the two met in New York City, and married in September 1830. William Wood worked in the family mercantile business Dennistoun & Company. He attended University of St Andrews and University of Glasgow and had a wide variety of intellectual interests. Elizabeth grew up in a loving home, where her secular and spiritual education were cultivated by her parents. She met Thomas Leiper Kane, her second cousin and future husband, when he visited her family in 1842. Her family relocated to New York City in 1844.

Elizabeth's mother died after giving birth to her seventh child when Elizabeth was ten years old. Her father's lack of skill in raising and nurturing children created an unhappy home life for Elizabeth. He married his cousin's widow, Margaret Lawrence, but Elizabeth never bonded with her stepmother. Her teenage years were full of emotional insecurity, influencing her desire to marry at an early age. She married Thomas Kane in 1853 in New York City, when she was sixteen. The couple lived in Philadelphia where Thomas's father, John K. Kane, worked as a United States District Court judge.

== Mid life ==
Elizabeth and Thomas Kane envisioned working together to close the gender equality gap through women's education and they also sought to reform the institution of marriage. She enrolled in the Female Medical College of Pennsylvania (now Drexel University Medical School) in 1854 as one of its first students. She studied on and off for 29 years, finally earning her M.D. in 1883. She and her husband founded a school for underprivileged children in Philadelphia, based on French preschools. She was a local leader in the House of Refugee movement, which served to help reform juvenile delinquents. She was also an amateur photographer.

Kane did not share her husband's interest in the members of the Church of Jesus Christ of Latter-day Saints; she resented them because of their influence on him and their practice of polygamy. While her husband was away working, her father-in-law suggested that she study mathematics to keep herself busy. With this newfound knowledge, she helped manage his business affairs with a practical hand. Her husband encouraged her to cultivate her writing skills, hoping she would become a political and activist writer. Although she did not become a public activist at the time, she did write privately. She also did some historical writing about local families and communities. Her most acclaimed work, however, was two travel accounts she wrote while accompanying her husband on a trip to visit the Mormons in Utah.

When Kane's husband went on extended trips to help his Mormon compatriots, he would abandon his job, leaving her in financial distress. Accustomed to an upper-middle-class lifestyle, she expected her husband to be the sole provider for the family. Her anxiety about their finances, however, made her consider finding employment on multiple occasions. She had to rely on her father-in-law for financial security during her husband's extended trips. In 1858, they moved to McKean and shortly after moved to Elk, where they would spend most of the year, returning to Philadelphia in the winter. When her husband enlisted in the Civil War, Kane and her children lived with her aunt, Ann Gray Thomas. Kane received special permission to pass through enemy lines to doctor her husband when he was wounded in battle. After returning home, the small settlement they started became Kane, Pennsylvania.

== Later life and death ==
Shortly after Kane graduated from medical school in 1883, her husband died of pneumonia. She continued to write, completing the final chapter of her father's autobiography after he died, as well as a biography of her ancestor John Kane. She taught in the Presbyterian Sunday School and was elected president of a local chapter of the Women's Christian Temperance Union, attending both state and national conventions.

She never independently practiced medicine, but her children often consulted with her about their patients. She traveled to Mexico with her son to a conference for the Pan-American Medical Congress. Her travel account in Mexico was published by Kane's newspaper. She remained politically active throughout her life. She continued to develop her skills and talents, botanical drawing, wood carving, microscopic picturing, and photography. She spoke fluent French, had fair skills in Swedish and Italian, and had learned German earlier in her life. She never lost her passion for learning; she was studying Spanish before she died on May 25, 1909, at the age of 73.

In an obituary, she was called the "Mother of Kane". The businesses in town closed in honor of her funeral, despite it being private.

== Career ==
=== Twelve Mormon Homes Visited in Succession on a Journey through Utah to Arizona ===
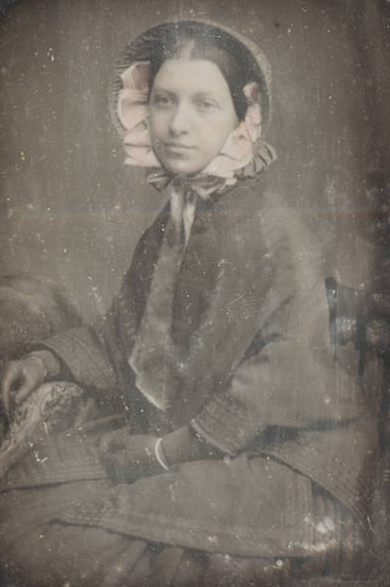
Elizabeth Kane as a young woman, likely taken in the mid-late 1850s

In the winter of 1872, Kane accompanied her husband on a twelve-day trip from Salt Lake City to St. George, Utah, with her two younger sons Evan O'Neil and William Wood, as guests of Brigham Young in view of Thomas Kane's work in defending the Latter-day Saints in Utah. She was initially uninterested in going but changed her mind when she thought the change in weather could improve her husband's poor health.

Kane hoped that issues with polygamy would be solved if Congress legitimized current polygamous marriages, but prohibited subsequent marriages. She used her time in Utah to converse with Mormon women and understand their opinions on polygamy. She was shocked to discover that they staunchly defended polygamy and appeared to be content in their plural marriages.

Kane's book Twelve Mormon Homes Visited in Succession on a Journey through Utah to Arizona, consisted of her letters home and her personal travel journal. This specific travel account described her time traveling through Salt Lake City to St. George. Each of the twelve homes she visited was a stop for food and lodging on the way. In writing, her objective was to inform rather than to persuade. This was neither an unusual approach nor a new topic, as at the time many writers wrote Mormon travel accounts similar to hers. According to Eric A. Eliason, the travel accounts had become their own style of literature, due to the interest and recording of the point of view of the subject matter. Kane followed this approach in writing her travel account, interviewing the Mormons and recording their opinions, while attempting to remain detached from the subject matter. In contrast to most of the Mormon travel accounts written at the time, her writing focused on rural Utah rather than urban locales, covering more than one visited settlement. She also added accounts of Mormon pioneering and their relationships with the Native Americans.

During her time in Utah, Kane had the opportunity to attend some Mormon church meetings. While many other travelers were not impressed with Mormon meetings, she admitted to liking their informality and simplicity. She was particularly impressed by a sermon given by William C. Staines, recording her children's fondness, but regretted not taking notes from it. Having spent a good deal of time with the Mormons in Salt Lake City, she befriended Mormon women, better understanding the issues of polygamy, women's rights, and the general hardships that Mormon people faced. She appreciated the goodness of the people, despite not sharing their beliefs.

Her husband encouraged her to publish her personal journals and letters to family in order to help lobby against the Poland Act. Kane used fictitious names to protect the Saints' anonymity. Twelve Mormon Homes Visited in Succession on a Journey through Utah to Arizona, was published in New York by her father in 1874. Experiencing growing sympathy for the Mormons, particularly the women, Kane hoped the book would lessen the persecution of the Latter-day Saints. While her book failed to attain mainstream success, it was received well by many and mentioned in some newspaper articles.

=== A Gentile Account of Life in Utah's Dixie ===
Kane's time in the Southern Utah desert in St. George was the turning point of her feelings towards Mormons. Although she enjoyed her time in Salt Lake City, she still harbored some negative feelings towards them. After associating with more women, she began to see polygamy in a light different than that portrayed by other writers. She observed the women's increased independence in comparison to Eastern ideas of harems, as Mormon women often contributed to running finances, businesses, and households while their husbands were away. She observed the relationships between members of a polygamous family, observing that the marriage worked quite well; some women were in love with their husbands and some women were not. Even though it was difficult sometimes, they believed there was a greater reward in heaven awaiting those who made sacrifices on the earth.

Kane revealed that she admired the Saints in St. George more than those in Salt Lake City, because she respected their economic sacrifices. At the end of the trip in Utah, her family was invited by Brigham Young to stay with his family at the Lion House. She wrote that her opinion had changed of the Mormons and that she was willing to stay and "eat salt with them". By the end of her book, Kane revealed she had become a friend of the Mormons, just like her husband, and she also involved herself in lobbying efforts to defend the Mormons. She wrote to Senator Simon Cameron, urging Congress to end persecution of the Saints, since it only fueled the fire of their faith, as they were willing to die for what they believed in. The Poland Act did pass, but it was a milder bill than initially proposed, perhaps due, in part, to the contributions of Elizabeth and Thomas Kane.A Gentile Account of Life in Utah's Dixie, was not published until 1995.

== Social and philosophical beliefs ==
=== Religious beliefs ===
Kane's deeply religious upbringing influenced the faith she maintained throughout her life. She attended church regularly, read the Bible, prayed frequently, and even wrote prayers in her journals. She tried to live her life by "God's will" and stated that her religion brought her peace and happiness. She was confirmed in the Presbyterian church when she was fifteen. After her first pregnancy ended in a miscarriage she began to fear for her own mortality. She also had deep-rooted fears because her own mother died in childbirth and she cited God as the source of her comfort. Evident of her religious beliefs, she believed that the miscarriage was a punishment from God for secretly not wanting the child and being ungrateful for the pregnancy.

Her husband's lack of interest in organized religion caused heartache for Elizabeth, feeling that she had to live her religion alone. Conflict arose when Thomas did not want their firstborn to be baptized. He pleased her for a time by announcing to her that he was a Christian before leaving on an extended trip to Utah in 1858. It gave her comfort while he was away, but she was devastated when he returned a few months later. His change of heart towards the Mormons strengthened her disdain for them. By the end of her trip to Utah, she reconciled with herself, realizing that although her husband did not espouse Christianity, he was a Christian by his works. Her encounters with the Mormons made her question and consider her own faith and made her wonder if her practice of religion was adequate compared to the Saints'.

=== Views on women ===
Kane was interested in the role that women played in society. As one of the first women to attend medical school at the Women's Medical College of Pennsylvania, she proved to be a pioneer in the cause of higher education for women. She was said to have associated with prominent women's rights advocate Lucretia Mott, to whom her husband introduced her. When she was newly married, she criticized society for reprimanding women for holding "respectable" jobs and, as a result, driving them to less respectable positions. She foresaw a time when women would have a more equal role to play in society. She and her husband were both very interested in the cause of women's rights, and he encouraged her to become a political activist for women. Her father, William Wood, also contributed to her early interest in higher education. He was a member of the New York City Board of Education and worked to open the Normal School for Females in 1870. Thomas Kane was supportive in promoting her education and often argued that those pursuits were more important than her responsibilities at home.

Developing her writing skills, she wrote a "Theory" on women in her personal diary in which she saw polygamy as a sexual double standard that held women to a higher level of chastity than men. In general, she criticized the sexualization of women in society. Drawing on her medical background, she claimed that sex leads to pregnancy, which leads to many health complications and often death for a woman after repeated childbirths and pregnancies. She argued that it was morally wrong for men to expect an excessive amount of childbearing from their wives, and she compared those wives to saintly martyrs. She was a supporter of "voluntary motherhood" but did not necessarily agree with the use of contraception. In her opinion, women should have the right to refuse sexual advances from their husbands to control their own bodies and pregnancies.

She advocated for more female doctors who would better be able to care for the female body, as well as sex education for young women before marriage. She maintained friendships with prominent woman doctors, including Ida Heiberger. She created specific guidelines by which sexually transmitted infections could be dramatically reduced. That included castrating infected males, exiling prostitutes, and granting divorces for males and females but forbidding remarriage. She believed more emphasis should be put on women's education rather than marriage, which should be achieved when one is grown and mature. Kane also believed in educating boys and girls together rather than separately and thought that both should be allowed to pursue outside occupations. She strongly supported women's suffrage.

=== Views on Mormons ===
Throughout her life, Kane's views on Mormons constantly shifted and were at many times ambivalent. In her book Twelve Mormon Homes Visited in Succession on a Journey through Utah to Arizona, the title on the second page was "Pandemonium or Arcadia: Which?" Kane metaphorically compared the Mormon community to Pandemonium, the city of Lucifer, and Arcadia, the rural Greek paradise. She revealed that the Mormon state was neither Pandemonium nor Arcadia but rather a mixture of both.

Kane was content with Presbyterianism and disliked several Latter-day Saint doctrines. She was offended by the Mormon claim to religious authority. She objected to polygamy because she believed that it subjugated women. Another reason that she claimed to have disliked the Mormons was that she felt that they drained her husband of his time and resources and prevented him from being interested in her own religion. In many respects, she tolerated the Mormons merely because she loved her husband and wanted to support him even if she failed to share his interest. Unsurprisingly, she did not believe that Mormons were Christian, which was a popular opinion at the time. Evident in her travel account Twelve Mormons, Kane was impressed by the high morals of the Mormon people and cited their humility, cleanliness, and hospitality.

Later, her views towards Mormons softened as she realized that they held her husband in as high esteem as she. She particularly grew to like William C Staines. Even though he treated her kindly, she still harbored significant animosity towards Brigham Young because he was the leader of the Mormons and an advocate for polygamy. She liked Mormon prayers and hymns, felt that Mormon prayers were more specific than Protestant ones, and welcomed how the whole congregation sang hymns in earnest. She was also impressed by the tolerance that Latter-day Saints had for Native Americans.

She witnessed Utah achieve statehood and the Manifesto end plural marriage. However, her condemnations of Mormons became their most severe upon hearing that a writer was going to publish a book that claimed that Thomas Kane was secretly a Mormon. She defended her husband by claiming that he was too intelligent to have believed stories in the Book of Mormon and the Doctrine and Covenants. She attributed his interest in Mormons solely to pity and gratitude. She always admired the faith of the Saints, but after the death of her husband, she largely ended associations with her former Mormon friends, which proved that was her husband's project, not her own. Kane respected the Saints and admired their faith and some of their religious practices, but she never really was a "friend of the Mormons" in the way that her husband had been.

== Personal life ==
=== Marriage ===
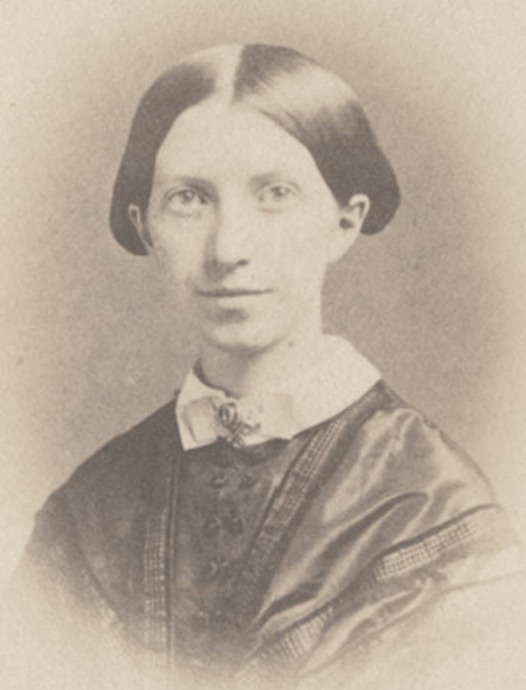
Elizabeth Wood as a teenager. This was likely taken around 1850, before she married Thomas L. Kane.

Elizabeth Wood first met Thomas Kane, her future husband, in 1840 when she was four years old and he was eighteen. He was on a trip to England at the time. He quickly built a relationship with her father, William Wood, which only improved after the death of her mother Harriet. Elizabeth's first memorable encounter with Thomas was at six years old when he was twenty. According to a family story, he gave her a French doll while visiting her family, which sparked her lifelong admiration. Having lost her mother at a young age, she found comfort in her studies and the occasional visit from her cousin Thomas, who, at the age of twelve, she decided she would marry.

Elizabeth was the victim of a difficult family situation, as her father was always working and she disliked her stepmother. As a result, she grew into a quiet, awkward teenager. This was in stark contrast to her love interest, Thomas, who grew up in the loud and outspoken Kane family. During one visit to the Kane family in Pennsylvania, she pretended to fall asleep, while Thomas played piano and sang in the next room, citing that she knew she had fallen in love with him after that moment. Having taken a liking to Elizabeth, he began visiting the Wood's residence frequently. After admitting their mutual attraction, they were engaged on January 25, 1852. As she was so young, her father was hesitant in granting permission, but he eventually agreed, on the condition that they wait until after her seventeenth birthday. They were married on April 21, 1853, three weeks before she turned seventeen, a fact that Thomas never explained.

Elizabeth was lovingly called "Bessie" by her husband, whom she called "Tom". They were both intelligent and idealistic, and they were united by their love for each other and their charity for the less fortunate. Nevertheless, they had vastly different personal philosophies and temperaments. Thomas was a compulsive decision-maker, known for taking risks, and he was suspicious of religious and social constructs. He sought to improve the world through dramatic action by heroically supporting the underdog. Elizabeth, on the other hand, was religious with a love of home and family, desiring physical and emotional security. She was also interested in social reform, but she felt that change was best accomplished through quiet, humble Christian service.

Her early marriage could be best understood by comparing Elizabeth to an "infatuated schoolgirl" and Thomas to her "mentor" or father figure. She was very young and Thomas intended to mold her into the wife and woman she had the potential to be. She idolized Thomas and was overly concerned with what her husband was thinking and feeling about her. Her feelings were hurt easily and her reactions often dramatic, largely due to the significant age and maturity gap between them. Elizabeth was also concerned with the amount of money Thomas was spending on his charities rather than starting his family. His willingness to leave his family and responsibilities to help the Mormons caused much tension in their marriage. He made great sacrifices, which forced her to make sacrifices as well for a cause she did not understand. These conflicts between Thomas and Elizabeth allowed her to become more independent and outspoken than she was at the beginning of their marriage.

She began to feel more comfortable and secure in marriage after the birth of the first two of her four children, Harriet Amelia and Elisha Kent. Although Thomas strove for gender equality in society, ironically he tended to dominate Elizabeth in the interests of his work. For example, he pressured her to apply for the medical school for which he served as a "corporator" (trustee) to promote the higher education of women. Even though they considered themselves to be equal companions in marriage, and Elizabeth had her own interests outside of marriage, Thomas was always the main focus of Elizabeth's life. It was a unique marriage for the times. On the one hand, Thomas wanted Elizabeth to be his intellectual equal and sought to mentor her to become a socially and politically prominent woman, rather than just a wife. On the other hand, there was a touch of irony and condescension in Thomas' mentorship, because he was often an overbearing husband who pushed Elizabeth into doing things because he felt that he knew best.

=== Children ===
The couple had four children: Harriet Amelia in 1855, Elisha Kent Kane in 1856, Evan O'Neil Kane in 1861, and William Kane in 1862. After Thomas' death, William took the name Thomas L. Kane, Jr. Three of their children became physicians, while Elisha Kane graduated from the engineering program at Princeton University.

Evan O'Neil Kane, a prominent surgeon, had an impressive and sometimes bizarre career; he was known for his inventions as well as operating on himself. Elizabeth, Evan, and William founded the Kane Woodside Hospital, which later became the Kane Summit Hospital, where Evan Kane was chief surgeon. The hospital closed in 1970, but still functions as an administration building for Kane Community Hospital.

=== Historic home ===
More than a decade after the death of her husband, the original Kane residence was destroyed by fire. In response, Elizabeth contracted with the Philadelphia architectural firm of Cope & Stewardson to design and build a new home in 1896. Her son Elisha Kent Kane would go on to rebuild an exact replica of the original family home at 90% scale and name it Silverside for his wife Zella, who was the silver side of ever storm cloud in his life. It is now owned by Artist and Author Jessica Lark and called Reliquarian House. In addition to her home it provides residencies year round for artists, authors, and writers through her non profit Elysian Sanctuary. Elizabeth subsequently named the Georgian Colonial Revival-style mansion "Anoatok" (the Eskimo–Aleut word for "the wind loved spot") in honor of her late brother-in-law and Arctic explorer Elisha Kent Kane. Following her death in 1909, ownership of the house was awarded to her sons Evan and Thomas, the latter of whom moved out after a new home was completed for him in 1910 by Cope & Stewardson. The residence was then converted into an inn by Evan's son, Elisha Kent Kane III, during the mid-1930s. Sold by the family to an outside party in 1983, it is now operated as a bed and breakfast, Kane Manor Inn, owned by Dr. Debra & Ben Miller.

== Legacy ==
Thomas and Elizabeth Kane founded the town of Kane, Pennsylvania. Elizabeth's books Twelve Mormon Homes Visited in Succession on a Journey through Utah to Arizona and A Gentile Account of Life in Utah's Dixie have become classics in Mormon and Western history, and unique first-hand accounts of Mormon polygamy. Her second book was republished in 1974 by the Tanner Trust Fund and the University of Utah Library, with the true identity of the families she met revealed. The Thomas L. and Elizabeth W. Kane papers, which include Elizabeth Kane's personal diary, reside in L. Tom Perry Special Collections in the Harold B. Lee Library at Brigham Young University.

== Bibliography ==
- Barnes, Darcee (2002), "A Biographical Study of Elizabeth D. Kane", Theses and Dissertations, Brigham Young University
- Barnes, Darcee (2017), "Elizabeth Kane's 'Mormon Problem': Another Perspective of Thomas L. Kane's Work for the Mormons", Journal of Mormon History, 43 (3): 68–95, doi:10.5406/jmormhist.43.3.0068, JSTOR 05654451
- Bly, Richard F (August 19, 1985). "Anoatok" (PDF). National Register of Historic Places Inventory — Nomination Form. Pennsylvania Historical and Museum Commission. Archived from the original (PDF) on June 29, 2020.
- Grow, Matthew J. (2009), "Liberty to the Downtrodden": Thomas L. Kane, Romantic Reformer, Yale University Press, ISBN 9780300136104, JSTOR j.ctt1npg5f
- Solomon, Mary Karen Bowen (1995), "Profile of Elizabeth Kane", A Gentile Account of Life in Utah's Dixie, 1872–73: Elizabeth Kane's St. George Journal, Salt Lake City, Utah: University of Utah Tanner Trust Fund, pp. xv–xxix, ISBN 9781560851042
- Whittaker, David J., ed. (2010), Colonel Thomas L. Kane and the Mormons, 1846-1883, Provo, Utah: BYU Studies, ISBN 9780842527569, OCLC 495597271
- Kane, Elizabeth Wood (1874), "Twelve Mormon homes visited in succession on a journey through Utah to Arizona", search.lib.byu.edu
- Whittaker, David (2001), "New Sources on Old Friends: The Thomas L. Kane and Elizabeth W. Kane Collection", Journal of Mormon History, 27 (1): 67–94, JSTOR 23288622
- Bushman, Claudia L. (October 7, 1999), "Mormon Domestic Life in the 1870s: Pandemonium or Arcadia?", Utah State University Press
- Eliason, Eric A (2001), "Curious Gentiles and Representational Authority in the city of the Saints", Religion and American Culture, 11 (2): 155–190, doi:10.1525/rac.2001.11.2.155, S2CID 145439152
- "Elizabeth Kane's Change of Heart", sites.lib.byu.edu, L. Tom Perry Special Collections
- Cutter, William Richard; Cuyler, Reynolds (1914), Genealogical and family history of southern New York and the Hudson River Valley, New York, NY: Lewis Historical Publishing, pp. 1156–1157
- "History", Kane Community Hospital, archived from the original on May 7, 2013
