= William Wood (banker, born 1808) =

Scottish-American banker

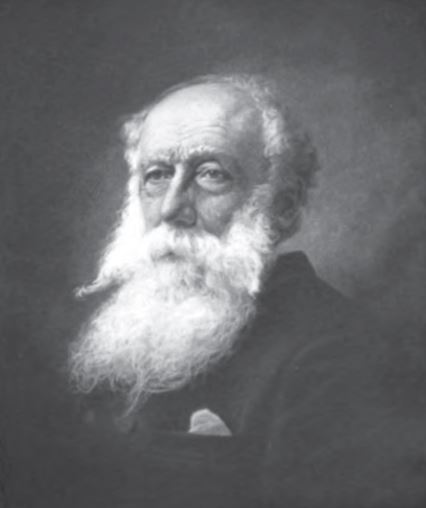

President of the Saint Andrew's Society of the State of New York
- In office 1865–1867
- Preceded by: Robert Gordon
- Succeeded by: John Taylor Johnston

Personal details
- Born: October 28, 1808 Glasgow, Scotland
- Died: October 1, 1894 (aged 85) New York City, New York, U.S.
- Spouse: Harriet A. Kane (m. 1830; died 1846)
- Children: 10
- Education: University of St Andrews; University of Glasgow
- Occupation: The Glasgow Academy

William Wood (October 21, 1808 – October 1, 1894) was a Scottish-American banker.

== Early life ==
Wood was born in Glasgow, Scotland, on October 21, 1808. His father was a prominent Glasgow merchant and banker who could trace his lineage back to Admiral Sir Andrew Wood, a hero of the British Navy.

At age 7, he went to William Angus' Grammar School in St. Mungo for two years, followed by the Glasgow Grammar School and Dr. Duncan's School at Ruthwell. In October 1821, he entered The Glasgow Academy until age sixteen, when he matriculated at the University of St Andrews, where he took the second and third mathematical prizes. After St Andrews, he attended the University of Glasgow where he took the highest prize in Natural Philosophy.

== Career ==
Shortly after his graduation, he began working in the family mercantile business J. & R. Dennistoun & Company. On November 3, 1828, he came to the United States for the firm, remaining only a short time before he returned to Scotland. In 1830, he returned to New York on Hibernia, married there, and returned to Glasgow, where he stayed until 1832 when he relocated to Liverpool to manage the branch of the business there. While in Liverpool, "in conjunction with Richard Cobden, he canvassed South Lancashire in the interests of the senior partner of Brown Brothers, the eminent banking house, who was about to seek the votes of that constituency for election to Parliament."

In 1844, Wood returned to the United States and opened Dennistoun, Wood & Co., remaining a partner until his retirement from the firm on December 31, 1860. In 1863, he assumed the management of the British and American Bank, where he worked until 1869.

=== Public office ===
In May 1869, Mayor A. Oakey Hall appointed Wood a Commissioner of Public Instruction and in May 1870, he was made a Commissioner of Docks and Ferries, serving through the administration of Mayor William F. Havemeyer until May 21, 1873.

In June 1870, he was appointed to the commission to expand Broadway to succeed Alexander Turney Stewart who retired. Wood served on the Board of Education until April 4, 1873 "when the Reform Party legislated him out of office." He was reappointed by Mayor William H. Wickham as a Commissioner of Education and eventually became President of the Board, serving almost twenty years where he was instrumental in the establishment of the Normal College for the training of teachers.

=== Social and club life ===
Wood was a member of the Century Association and served as an elder of the Collegiate Dutch Reformed Church, although a member of the Congregational Church. In December 1828, he was elected a member of the Saint Andrew's Society of the State of New York and served as president of the society from 1865 to 1867.

== Personal life ==
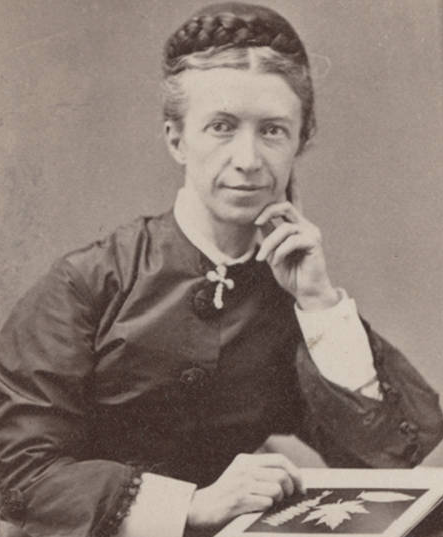
Wood's daughter, Elizabeth Kane, c. 1872.

On September 15, 1830, he was married to Harriet Amelia Kane (1810–1846), daughter of John Kane and Maria (née Codwise) Kane. Together, they were the parents of six children, including:

- John Walter Wood (1831–1905), who married Sabina Redmond (1836–1905), sister of Goold H. Redmond and Annie Redmond Cross.
- Charlotte Matilda Wood (b. 1832), who married the Rev. Edward Bell, Vicar of Wakefield.
- Elizabeth Dennistoun Wood (1836–1909), who married her second cousin, Thomas Leiper Kane, son of John Kintzing Kane, a United States District Court judge (his father was a first cousin of her mother).
- Harriet Maria Wood (1838–1904), who died unmarried.
- William Wood Jr. (1841–1867)
- Helen Kane Wood (1843–1919), who married George Burghall Watts Jr.

After his first wife's death giving birth to their seventh child, he remarried to Margaret Lawrence (1823–1871), the daughter of James Van Horne Lawrence and Emily Augusta (née Kane) Lawrence. Together, they were the parents of four children, including:

- Dennistoun Wood (d. 1904), who married Edith Phillips, daughter of Howard C. Phillips, on January 2, 1875.
- Chalmers Wood (1856–1924), who married Ellen Appleton Smith, daughter of John Cotton Smith.
- Henry Duncan Wood, who married Ellen E. Pulsifer, daughter of William H. Pulsifer of St. Louis, Missouri, on April 24, 1878.
- Van Horne Lawrence Wood (b. 1860), who married Bessie Dora Biggs.

After the death of his second wife, he married thirdly to Helen Mason, daughter of Henry Mason and Lydia (née James) Mason, on December 6, 1883.

Wood died on October 1, 1894, at 4 West 18th Street, his home in New York City. After a funeral at the Collegiate Reformed Church, he was buried at Green-Wood Cemetery in Brooklyn.
