= Brookings Hall =

College building in Missouri, U.S.

Coordinates: 38.6480°N 90.3052°W

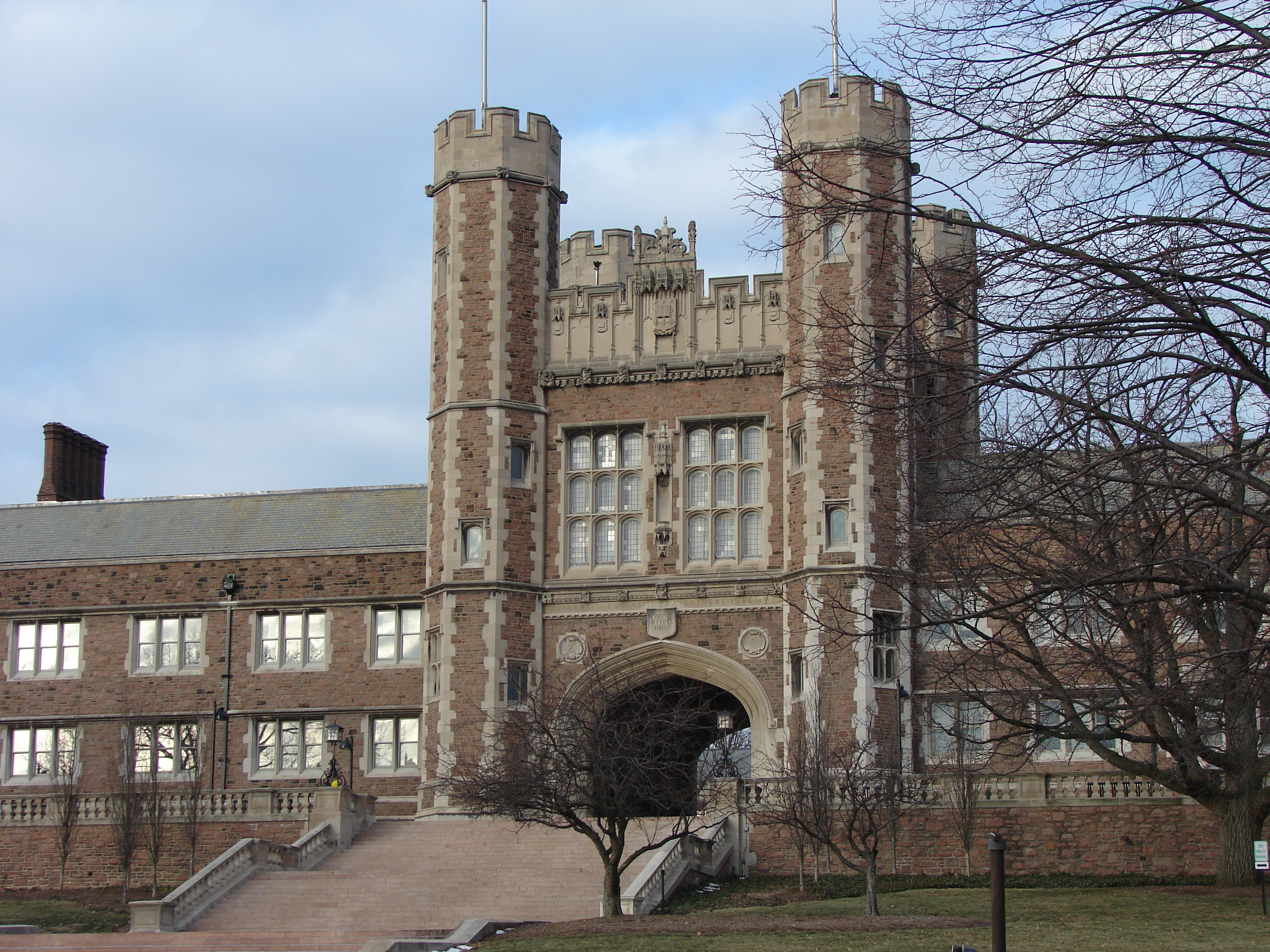
Brookings Hall designed by Cope and Stewardson

Brookings Hall is a Collegiate Gothic landmark on the campus of Washington University in St. Louis. The building, first named "University Hall", was built between 1900 and 1902 and served as the administrative center for the 1904 World's Fair. The first cornerstone was laid on November 3, 1900.

In 1899, after holding a national design competition, Washington University's administrators selected the Philadelphia firm Cope and Stewardson (represented by James P. Jamieson) to design the building as the centerpiece of an extensive new campus master plan. The general contractor was Bright Construction Company.

A large square tower with corner turrets and an arched passageway below was a favorite motif of the architects that they also used at Blair Hall of Princeton University (1897), the Quadrangle dormitories at the University of Pennsylvania (1894–1912), and Rockefeller Hall at Bryn Mawr College (1904) and was likely inspired by the Great Gates of Trinity and St. John's colleges at Cambridge University in England, where Cope and Stewardson are known to have visited.

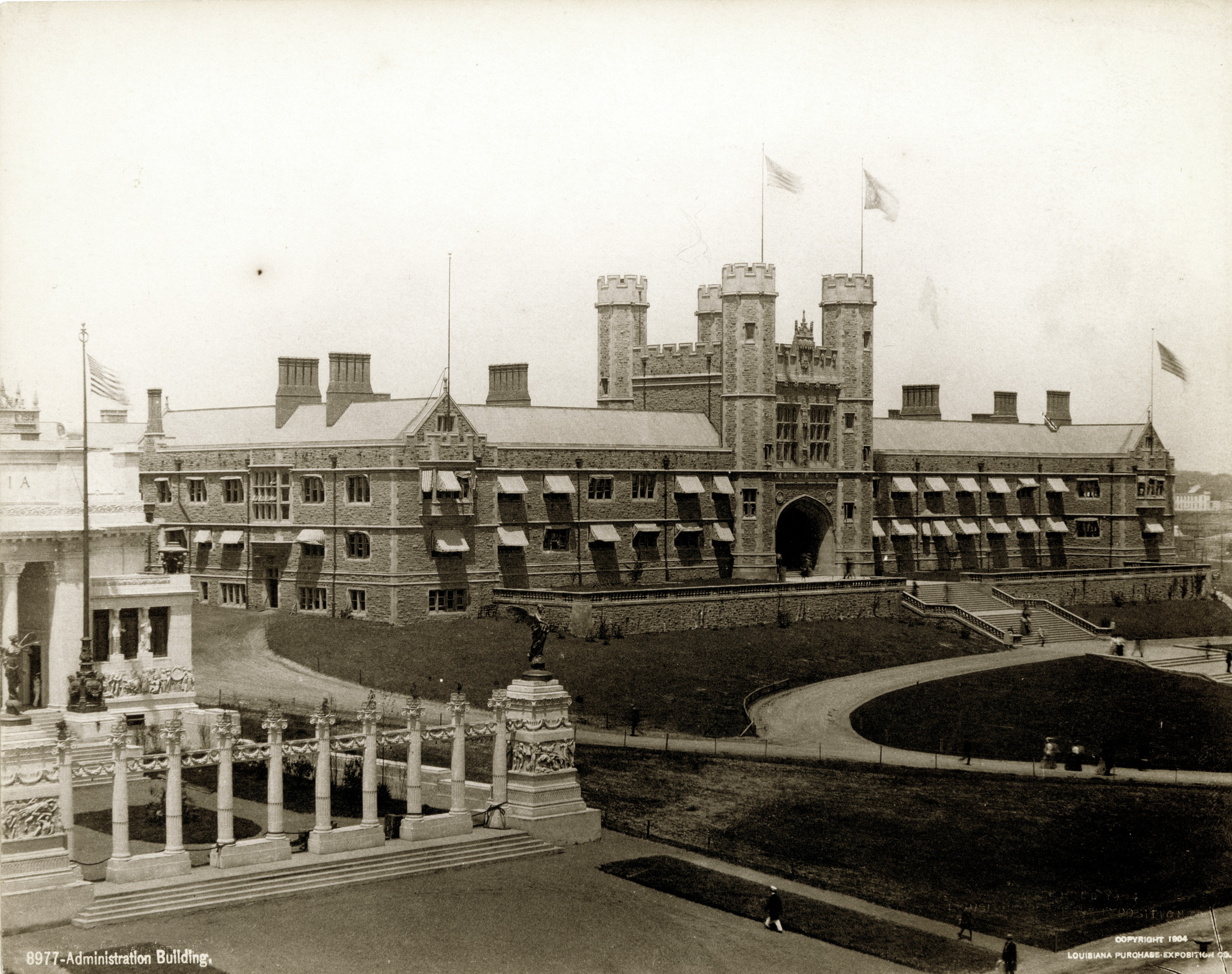
Brookings Hall during the 1904 World's Fair

Since 1905, the building has served as Washington University's administrative center. Initially known as University Hall, the building was renamed Brookings Hall on June 12, 1928, in honor of board president Robert S. Brookings.

There are numerous inscriptions on the building; most prominent is the inscription above the clock on the Western side which reads Cedunt Horae, Opera Manent ("The hours go by, the works remain"). The inscription on the east facade reads Discere Si Cupias Intra: Salvere Iubemus ("If you wish to learn, enter: we welcome you").

Alumnus Steve Fossett used Brookings Hall as a mission control center for two of his attempts at circumnavigating the globe in a balloon, including his sixth and ultimately successful attempt in the Spirit of Freedom in 2002.

Currently, South Brookings houses the Admissions Office and the administrative offices for the College of Arts and Sciences. North Brookings houses the Office of Student Financial Services, the Office of the Chancellor, and the Graduate School of Arts and Sciences.
