= Anoatok =

Historic house in Pennsylvania, United States

- U.S. National Register of Historic Places
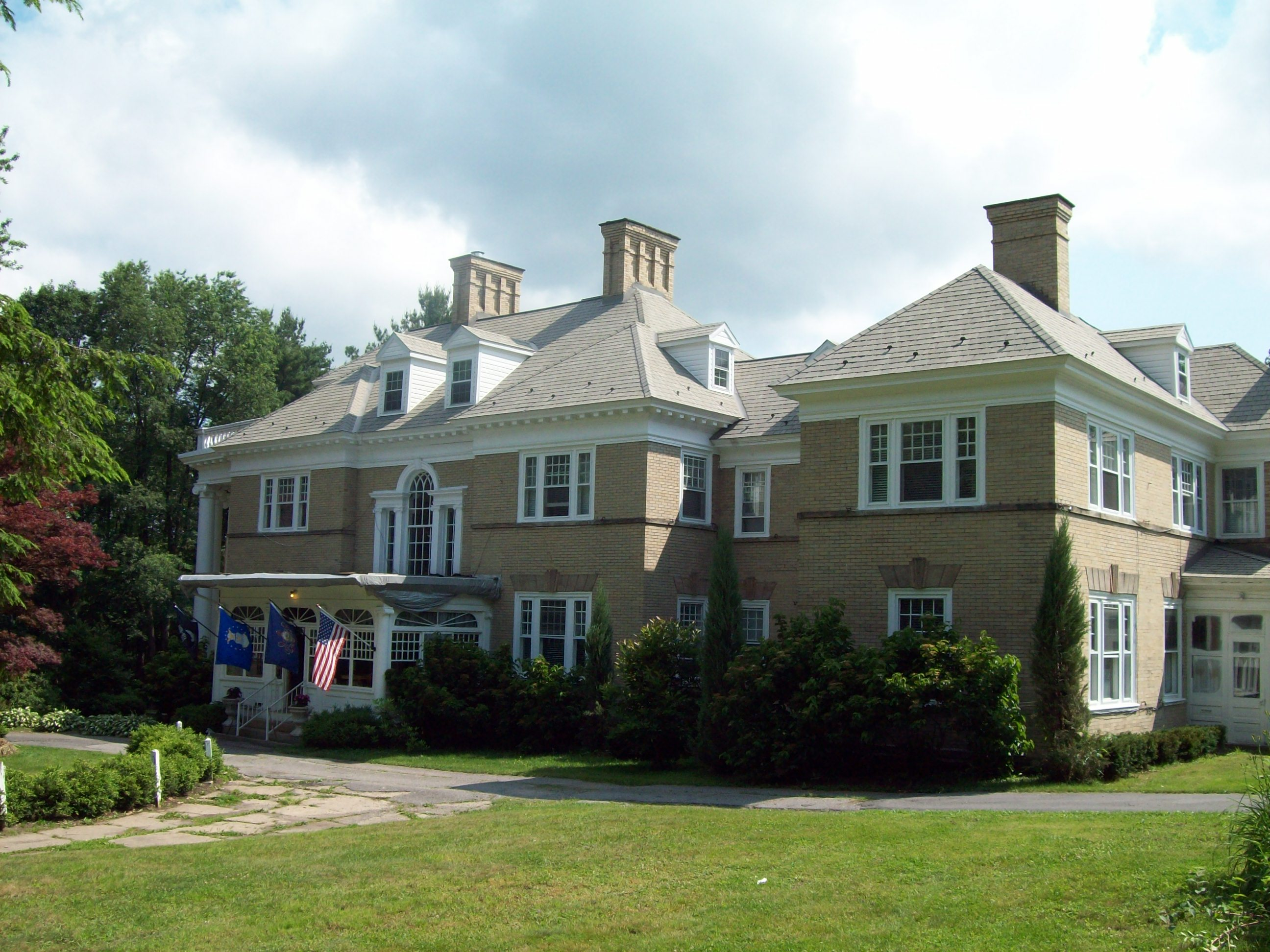
- Anoatok in June 2009

- Location within Pennsylvania
- Location: 230 Clay Street; Kane, Pennsylvania, U.S.
- Coordinates: 41°39′50.5″N 78°47′56.5″W
- Area: 10 acres (4.0 ha)
- Built: 1896–1897
- Architect: Cope & Stewardson
- Architectural style: Colonial Revival, Georgian
- NRHP reference No.: 86000039
- Added to NRHP: January 7, 1986

Anoatok (Eskimo-Aleut for "the wind loved spot"), now Kane Manor Inn, is an historic residence which is located in Kane, Pennsylvania, in McKean County. Commissioned by the author, physician and women's rights activist Elizabeth Dennistoun Wood Kane (1836–1909), one of the first women to enroll in the Medical College of Pennsylvania and the widow of American Civil War General Thomas L. Kane (1822–1883), the home was erected in 1896 after being designed for Elizabeth Kane by Cope & Stewardson, one of the most prominent architecture firms of the late 1800s and early 1900s. The mansion's name alludes to the exploits of her late brother-in-law and Arctic explorer Elisha Kent Kane.

This property was listed on the National Register of Historic Places on January 7, 1986.

== History ==
After the destruction by fire of her family's home in Kane, Pennsylvania in 1896, author, physician and women's rights activist Elizabeth Dennistoun Wood Kane, one of the first women to enroll in the Medical College of Pennsylvania, chose Cope & Stewardson, to design and build a new residence for her and her sons. One of the most influential architecture firms in the nation at that time, Cope & Stewardson completed work on the Georgian Colonial Revival-style mansion during 1896 and 1897. She subsequently named her new residence "Anoatok" in honor of the Arctic explorations of her late brother-in-law, Elisha Kent Kane.

Following Elizabeth Kane's death at the mansion in 1909, ownership of the residence was awarded to her sons Evan and Thomas, the latter of whom moved out after a new home was completed for him in 1910 by Cope & Stewardson. Anoatok was then converted into an inn by Evan's son, Elisha Kent Kane III, during the mid-1930s. Sold by the family to an outside party in 1983. In 2003, the home was sold to David Krieg of Wilcox who then sold the property to Ben and Dr. Debra Miller (2020) who currently own the home and operate it as the Kane Manor Inn.

== Architectural features ==
According to Richard F. Bly, president of Commonwealth Historic Properties, Inc. and the individual who prepared the nomination form on August 19, 1985, to secure placement of this property on the National Register of Historic Places, Anoatok was "the most prominent residence in Kane" during the 1980s, due as much to its design and craftsmanship, as to its placement on land which was 2,040 feet above sea level. Erected in such a way that it afforded its inhabitants "a spectacular view of the South Branch Kinzua Creek Valley," the residence remained "virtually unaltered in its overall floor plan since being erected in 1897-97." Designed in the Georgian Colonial Revival style by Cope & Stewardson, Elizabeth Kane's three-story, 18,000 square foot, rectangular brick frame residence was erected on a cut sandstone foundation, and had "a buff face brick exterior" which employed bricks that had been manufactured by the Kane Brick Company in nearby Sergeant, Pennsylvania. The brown-shingled hip roof was built with three small dormers "encasing one window each on both the eastern and western exposures," and a north-to-south-running widow's walk was built on the roof's apex. "The two parallel railings of turned wood balusters [were] painted white and [ran] between two solid buff brick cupolas." In addition, each of the building's exposures was adorned with a cut stone frieze, which "served as the sill for all second story windows."

== See also ==
- National Register of Historic Places listings in McKean County, Pennsylvania

== Sources ==
- Barnes, Darcee (2002), A Biographical Study of Elizabeth D. Kane, Brigham Young University
- Bly, Richard F (August 19, 1985). "Anoatok". National Register of Historic Places Inventory — Nomination Form. Pennsylvania Historical and Museum Commission. Archived from the original on April 16, 2022.
- The Pennsylvania Medical Journal, Vol. 9, No. 6, p. 463: "Officers and Members of the Sixty-One Component County Societies: McKean County Society Members", Medical Society of the State of Pennsylvania, 1906
