= Cope and Stewardson =

American architecture firm

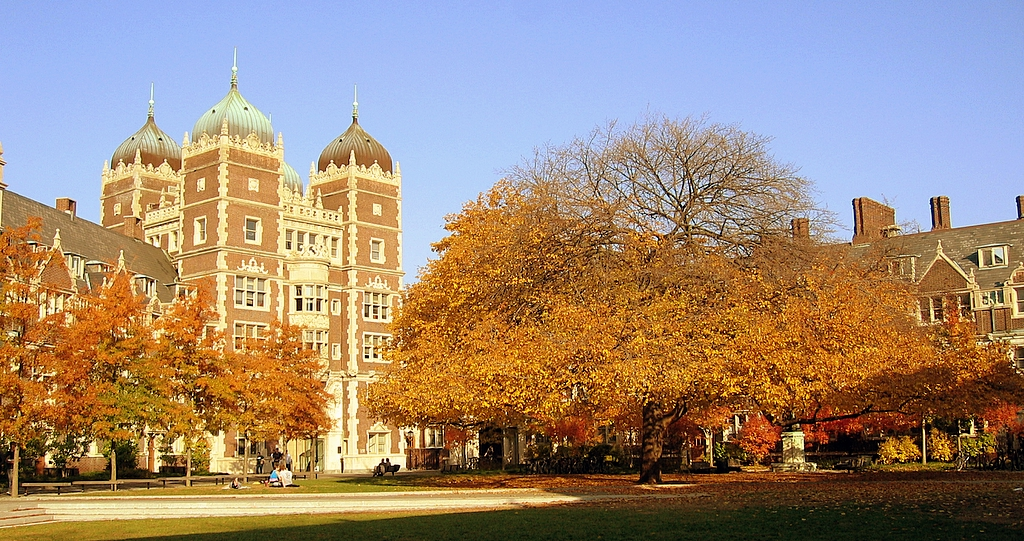
The Quadrangle Dormitories at the University of Pennsylvania in Philadelphia, constructed in 1895

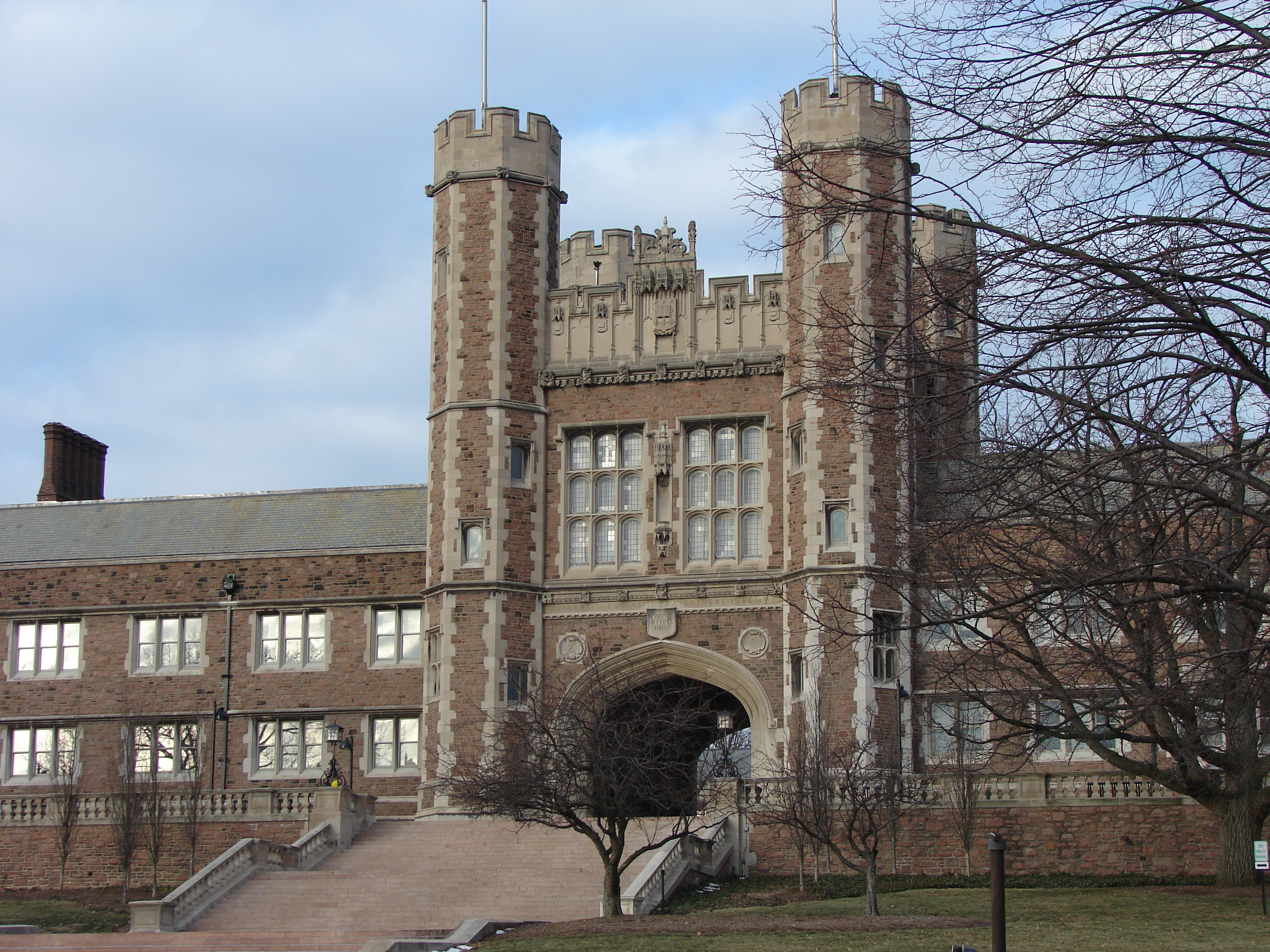
Brookings Hall at Washington University in St. Louis in St. Louis, constructed between 1900 and 1902

Cope and Stewardson (1885–1912) was a Philadelphia architecture firm founded by Walter Cope and John Stewardson, and best known for its Collegiate Gothic building and campus designs. Cope and Stewardson established the firm in 1885, and were joined by John's brother Emlyn in 1887. It went on to become one of the most influential and prolific firms of the late-19th and early-20th centuries.

Cope and Stewardsons made formative additions to the campuses of Bryn Mawr College, Princeton University, the University of Pennsylvania, and Washington University in St. Louis. They also designed nine cottages and an administrative building at the Sleighton School, which showed their adaptability to other styles, because their buildings here were Colonial Revival with Federal influences. In 1912, the firm was succeeded by Stewardson and Page formed by Emlyn Stewardson and George Bispham Page.

== Style and influence ==
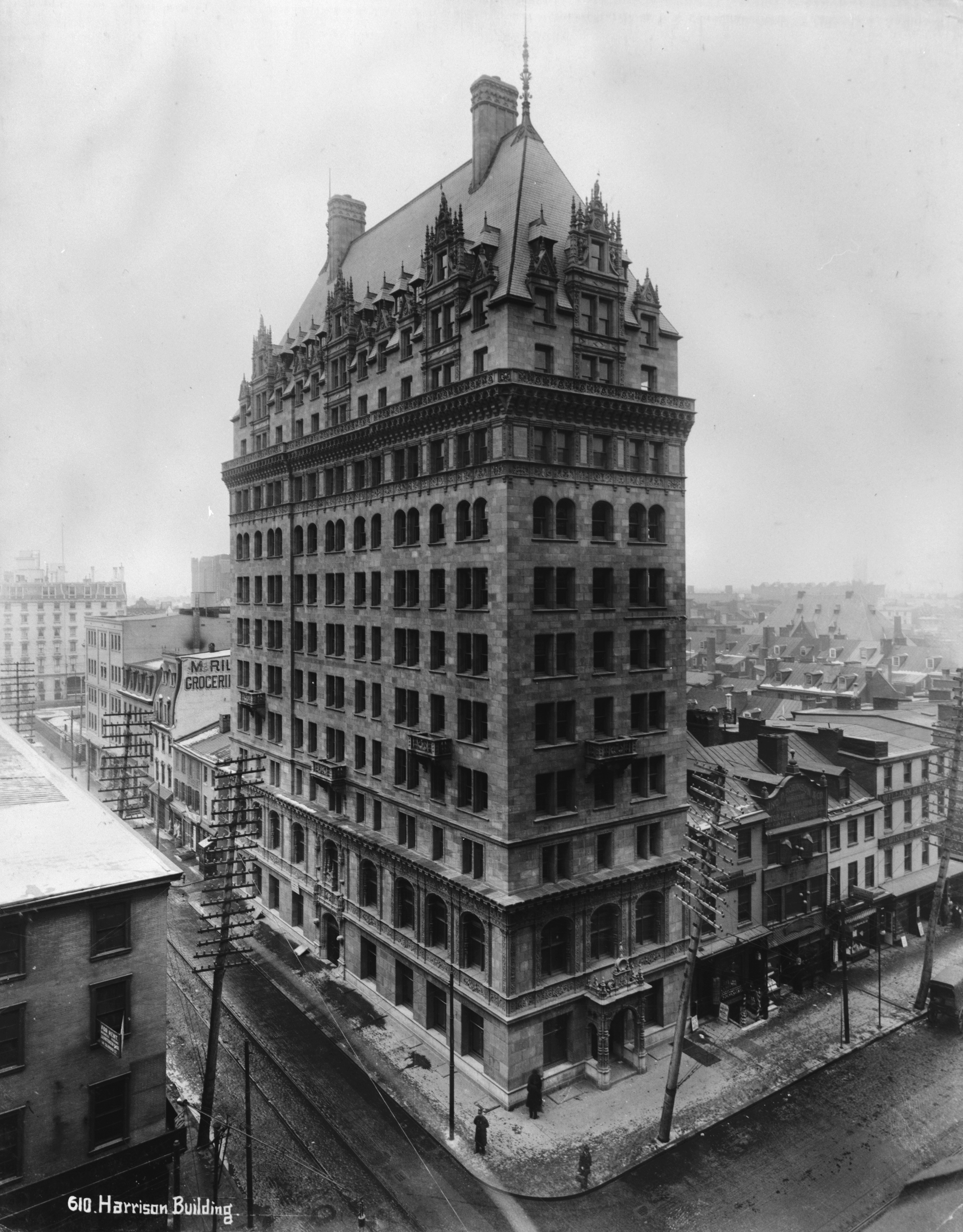
The Alfred C. Harrison Building in Philadelphia, built between 1894 and 1895 and demolished in 1969

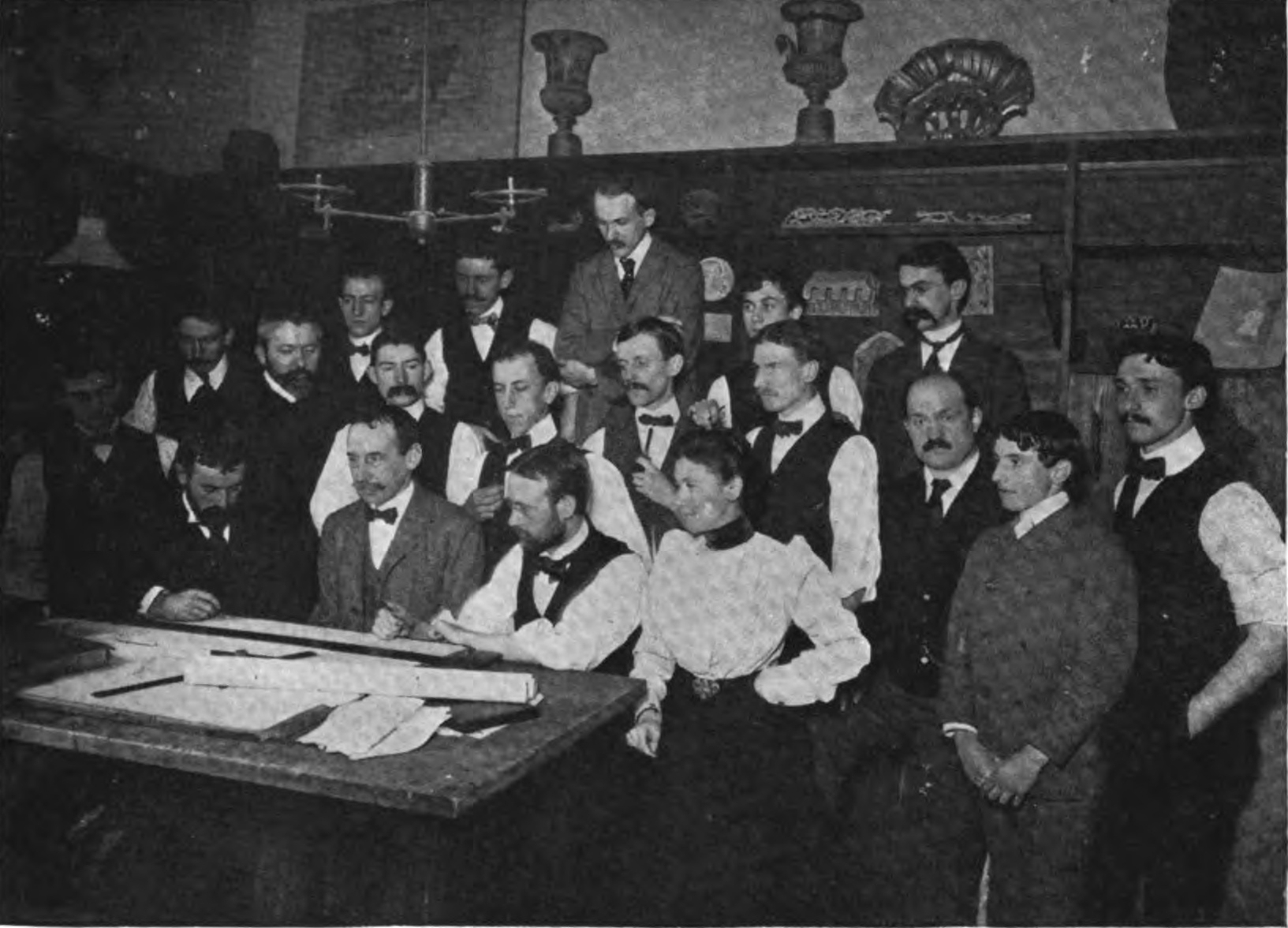
Cope and Stewardson's offices, circa 1899

Although Walter Cope and John Stewardson were major exponents of the Collegiate Gothic style which swept campuses across the country in the latter part of the 19th century, they were equally adept at other styles. Their first important commission was the main YMCA for Richmond, Virginia (1885–87), designed in a Richardsonian Romanesque style.

Their earliest major Collegiate Gothic building was Radnor Hall at Bryn Mawr College, built in 1886, where they replaced Cope's mentor Addison Hutton as campus architects. Commissions shortly followed for buildings on the campuses of the University of Pennsylvania, Princeton University, and Washington University in St. Louis, which served as administrative buildings for the 1904 St. Louis World's Fair. Although these academic buildings were their hallmark, other projects included residential, commercial, institution, and industrial buildings.

The firm designed Philadelphia buildings for the Harrison brothers, heirs to an enormous sugar-refining fortune. The Charles Custis Harrison Building (1893–94) was a Richardsonian Romanesque office building at 10th and Market Streets. It was demolished in 1979 to build The Gallery at Market East, an urban shopping mall. Directly north of it was the Harrison Stores (1893–94), a block-long commercial building and warehouse. This burned in 1984 during a renovation, and was demolished. The Alfred Craven Harrison Building (1894–95) was a chateauesque hotel and office tower at the southwest corner of 15th and Market Streets, opposite Broad Street Station. Demolished in 1969, the site is now occupied by the Centre Square Building and Claes Oldenburg's Clothespin. The firm also designed "Anoatak," the Georgian Revival style home of Civil War General Thomas L. Kane and Dr. Elizabeth Kane in Kane, Pennsylvania.

Charles Custis Harrison became provost of the University of Pennsylvania in Philadelphia in 1894, and immediately removed Frank Furness as unofficial campus architect, replacing him with Cope & Stewardson. Under Harrison, the university embarked on the biggest building boom in its history, with Cope & Stewardson designing the mammoth Quadrangle dormitories and new buildings for the engineering school, medical school, dental school, veterinary school, law school, zoological labs and English department – most clad in Collegiate Gothic. The firm also collaborated with architects Wilson Eyre and Frank Miles Day on the initial phases of the Arts & Crafts-style University of Pennsylvania Museum of Archaeology and Anthropology (1895–99).

As important as their contribution to the architecture of Philadelphia and its environs is the role which Cope & Stewardson played in architectural education. Great numbers of young apprentices and would-be architects passed their days of training in the office, making it a general stopping place for many architects who would later become famous in their own right. In 1923, the annual T-Square club exhibition catalog published a photograph of the Cope & Stewardson office from about 1899. Included among the partners and younger architects were: Walter Cope, John A. MacMahon, James O. Betelle (later of Newark, New Jersey); Emlyn Stewardson, S. A. Cloud, Wetherill P. Trout, Herbert C. Wise, James P. Jamieson, Eugene S. Powers, E. Perot Bissell, Louise Stavely, Charles H. Bauer (later of Newark, New Jersey), William Woodburn Potter, John Molitor, Camillo Porecca, and C. Wharton Churchman.

== Walter Cope (1860–1902) ==
In 1860, Walter Cope was born in Philadelphia to Thomas P. Cope and Elizabeth Waln Stokes Cope. After graduating from the Germantown Friends School, he attended classes at the Pennsylvania Academy of the Fine Arts in 1883. In 1885 the firm of Cope & Stewardson was established.

Cope was a founding member of the T-Square Club in 1883 and later served as vice-president, secretary, treasurer, president, and as a member of the executive committee. He was also a professor of architecture at the University of Pennsylvania from 1892 to 1902. After teaching at Penn, he became a professor at the Pennsylvania Academy of the Fine Arts. He died after suffering a stroke in 1902.

Cope was also part of the investigating committee appointed to study conditions governing the new State Capitol Building competition in 1901. From 1896 to 1898 he was chairman of the committee on the restoration of Independence Hall.

== John Stewardson (1858–1896) ==
John Stewardson, son of Thomas and Margaret Haines Stewardson, was born in 1858. His early education had been in private Christian schools in the Philadelphia area. He continued his studies at Adams Academy in Quincy, Massachusetts, from 1873 to 1877. After graduation, he entered Harvard College, but left in 1878. He briefly continued his studies at the University of Pennsylvania and then joined the Atelier Pascal in Paris, France. In 1882 he returned to Philadelphia, working first in T. P. Chandler's office and then in the office of Frank Furness.

In 1884 he returned to Europe to travel through Italy and Belgium. A year later, he joined in personal practice with Walter Cope. They were joined in 1887 by John's younger brother Emlyn L. Stewardson, who had recently graduated from the University of Pennsylvania with a degree in civil engineering.

In 1892, Stewardson joined the University of Pennsylvania as staff lecturer in their new School of Architecture. He was also one of the founding members of the T-Square Club, serving in 1885 and 1891 as president of that organization. He also served as treasurer of the Philadelphia Chapter of the American Institute of Architects (AIA) in 1886.

He is credited with the taste for English Gothic Revival which Cope & Stewardson used in their collegiate buildings. Talbot Hamlin, in his biographical description, for the Dictionary of American Biography notes that, following Stewardson's trip to England in 1894, the buildings at the University of Pennsylvania, which were on the boards at the time, changed from stone structures to brick with stone trim.

Stewardson died in 1896 after a skating accident on the Schuylkill River, where he had gone for an afternoon's outing with his friend, the architect Wilson Eyre. Following his funeral his fellow architects established a fund, now known as the prestigious Stewardson Fellowship, which is awarded annually to promising young architects from the Commonwealth of Pennsylvania to study architecture abroad. He is interred with a modest marker at Philadelphia's Laurel Hill Cemetery, Section 14, Plots 235&236.

== Selected buildings ==
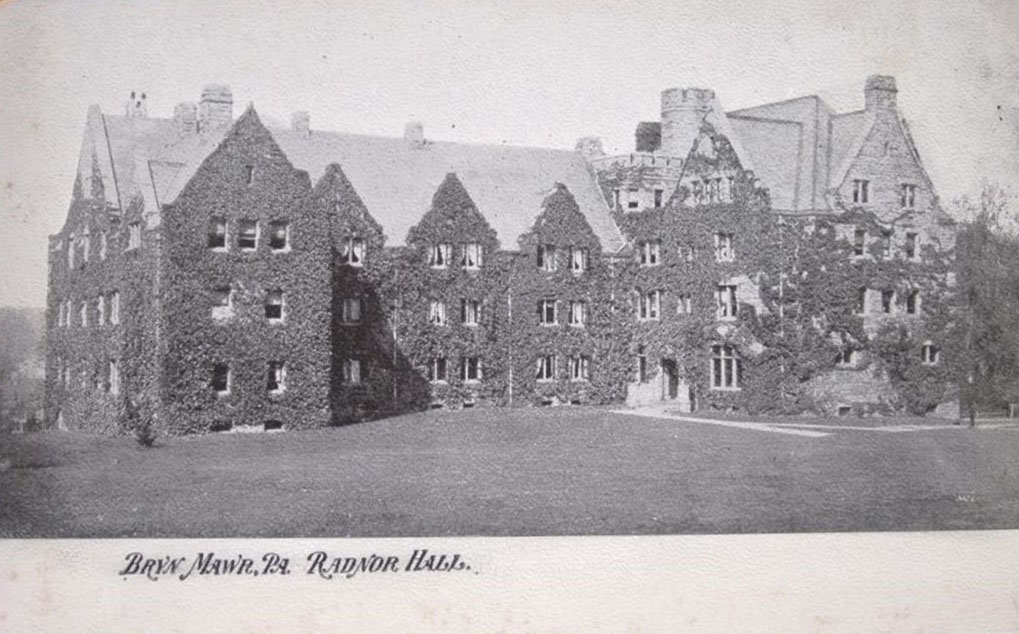
Radnor Hall, Bryn Mawr College, Bryn Mawr, Pennsylvania (1887)

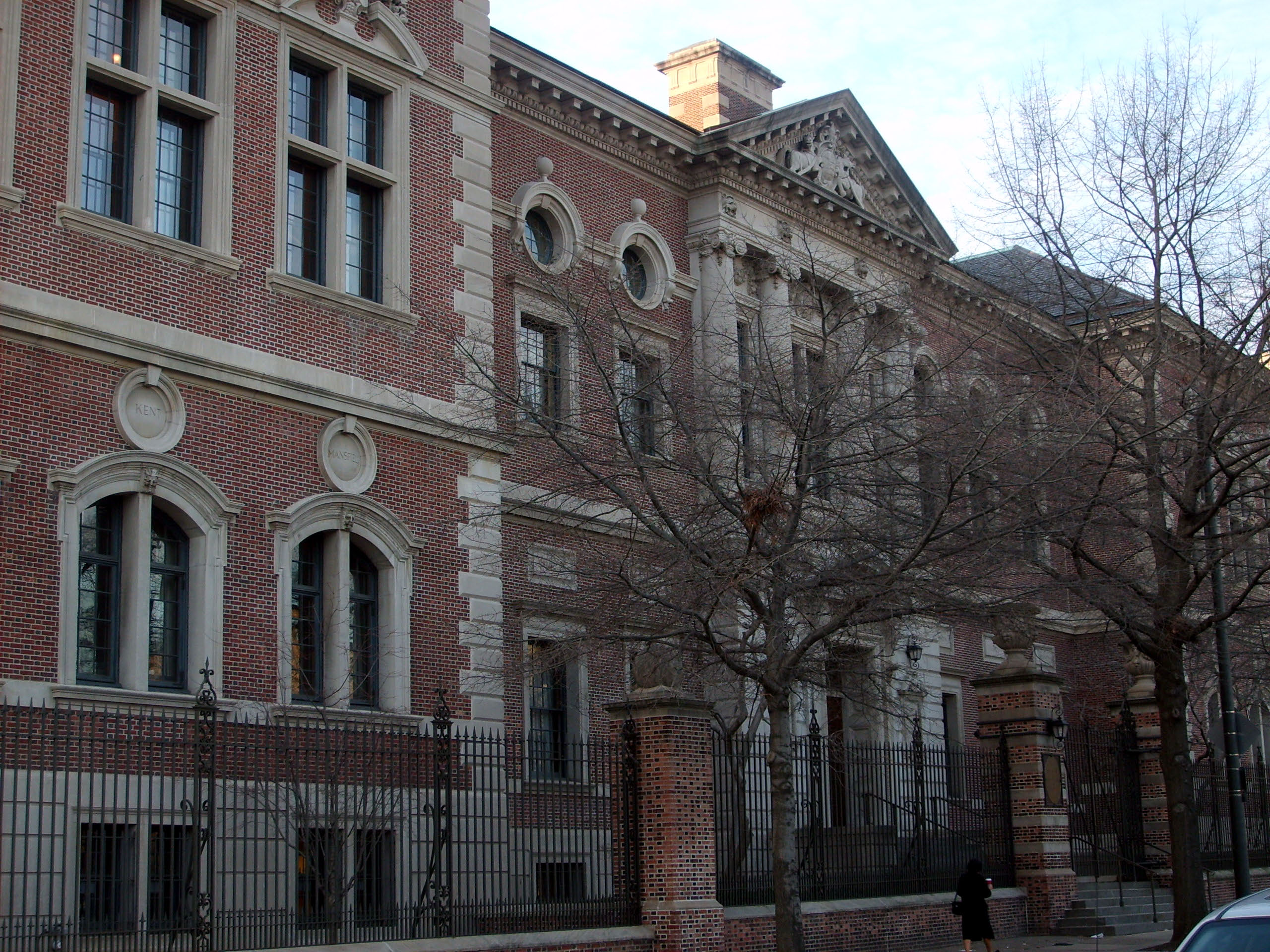
University of Pennsylvania Law School (now Silverman Hall), Philadelphia (1898–1901)

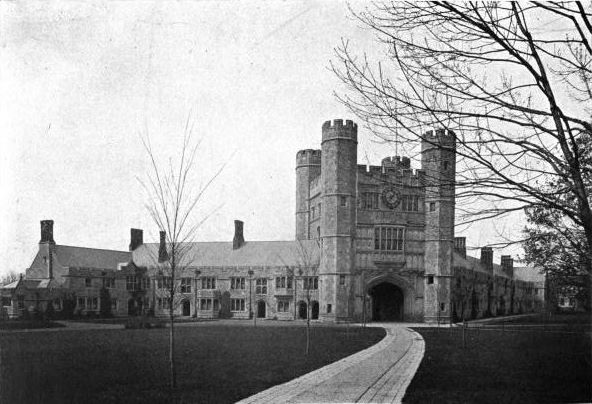
Blair Hall, Princeton University, Princeton, New Jersey (1896)

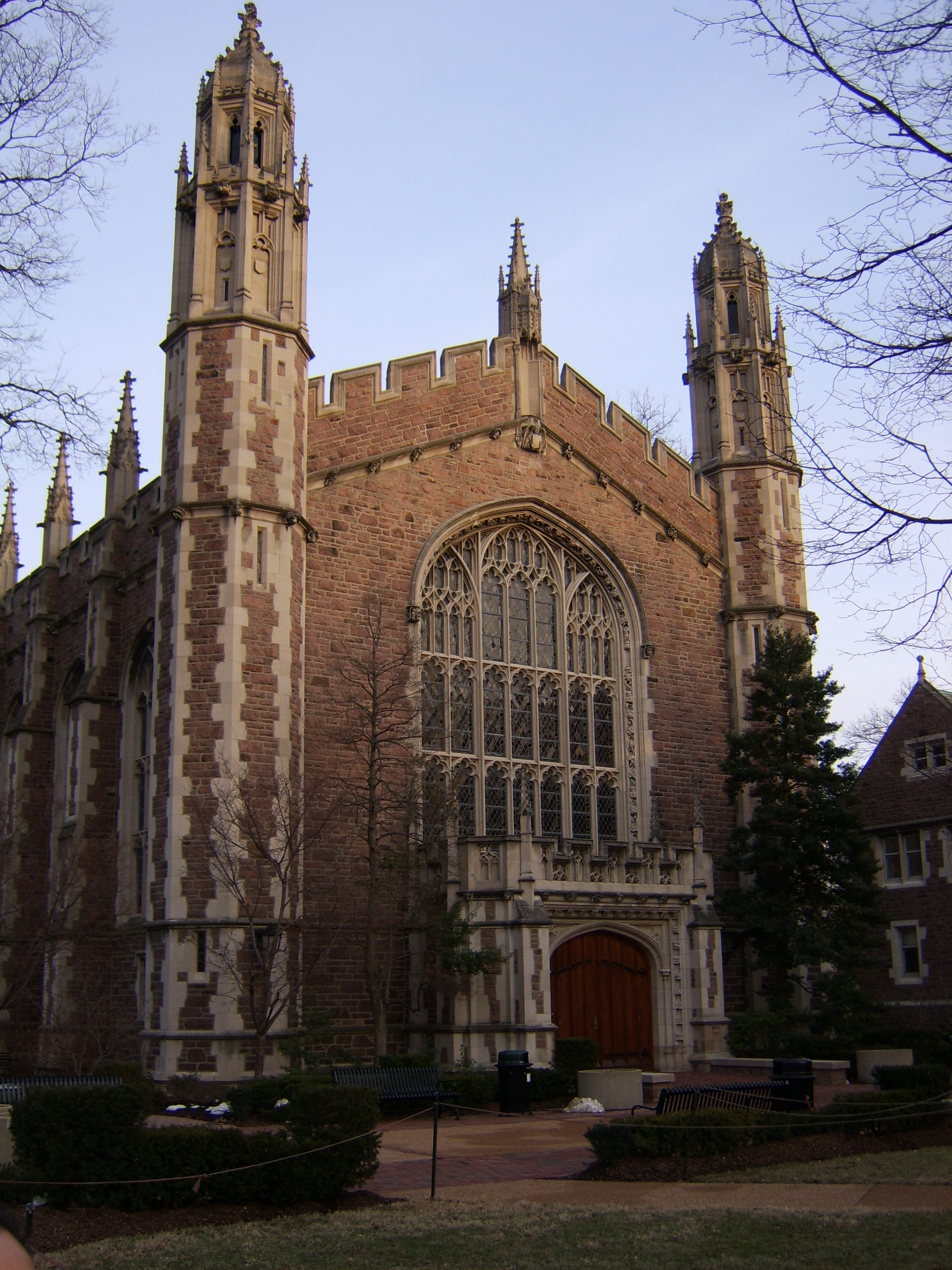
Graham Chapel, Washington University in St. Louis, Missouri (1909)

=== Bryn Mawr College ===
- Radnor Hall, Bryn Mawr College (1887)
- Denbigh Hall, Bryn Mawr College (1890–91)
- Dalton Hall, Bryn Mawr College (1893)
- Pembroke Hall, Bryn Mawr College (1892–94)
- The Deanery, Bryn Mawr College (1894–96)
- Rockefeller Hall, Bryn Mawr College (1901–04)
- Old Library, Bryn Mawr College (1904–07)

=== University of Pennsylvania ===
- Quadrangle Dormitories, University of Pennsylvania (1895)
- University of Pennsylvania Museum of Archaeology and Anthropology (1895–99), with Wilson Eyre and Frank Miles Day
- Law School, University of Pennsylvania (1898–01)
- "Towne Building, University of Pennsylvania". www.facilities.upenn.edu.
- "Veterinary Medicine Old Quadrangle". University of Pennsylvania Facilities and Real Estate Services.
- St. Anthony Hall House, University of Pennsylvania (c. 1908)
- Bennett Hall, University of Pennsylvania (1910)
- Evans Building, School of Dentistry, University of Pennsylvania (1910), with John T. Windrim
- "Leidy Laboratories of Biology". University of Pennsylvania Facilities and Real Estate Services. 1911.

=== Princeton University ===
- Blair Hall, Princeton University (1896)
- Buyers Hall, Princeton University (1896)
- The Ivy Club, Princeton University (1897)
- Stafford Little Hall, Princeton University (1898)
- University Gymnasium, Princeton University (1902)

=== Washington University in St. Louis ===
- Busch Hall, Washington University in St. Louis (1900)
- Cupples Hall I, Washington University in St. Louis (1901)
- Cupples Hall II, Washington University in St. Louis (1901)
- Prince Hall, Washington University in St. Louis (1901, demolished in 2006)
- Ridgley Hall and Holmes Lounge, Washington University in St. Louis (1902)
- Umrath Hall, Washington University in St. Louis (1902)
- Eads Hall, Washington University in St. Louis (1902)
- Francis Gymnasium, Washington University in St. Louis (1902)
- Brookings Hall, Washington University in St. Louis (1902). Served as the administration building during the 1904 World's Fair.
- McMillan Hall, Washington University in St. Louis (1907)
- Graham Chapel, Washington University in St. Louis (1909)

=== Buildings Elsewhere ===
- Young Men's Christian Association, 6th & Main Streets, Richmond, Virginia (1885–87, demolished)
- Graystone (Abram Huston House), Coatesville, Pennsylvania (1889)
- Charles Custis Harrison Building, 1001-05 Market Street, Philadelphia (1893–94, demolished in 1979)
- Harrison Stores, 1001-25 Filbert Street, Philadelphia (1893–94, demolished in 1984)
- Alfred Craven Harrison Building, 4 South 15th Street, Philadelphia (1894–95, demolished in 1969)
- Anoatok, Kane, Pennsylvania (1896). Now Kane Manor Inn.
- Catholic Philopatrian Literary Institute, 1923 Walnut Street, Philadelphia (1897)
- Lloyd Hall, Haverford College, Haverford, Pennsylvania (1898–99)
- Overbrook School for the Blind, 6333 Malvern Avenue, Philadelphia (1899)
- Philadelphia & Reading Railroad Elkins Park Station, Spring and Park Avenues, Elkins Park, Pennsylvania (1899)
- Lukens Main Office Building, 50 South 1st Avenue, Coatesville, Pennsylvania (1902, 1916)
- John A. Wilson Building (District Building), Washington, D.C. (1908)
- College of Physicians of Philadelphia, 19 South 22nd Street, Philadelphia (1909)
- Sleighton Farm School, Glen Mills, Pennsylvania (1909–10). A reformatory for troubled girls, C&S designed the administration building and 9 residence buildings. The campus was abandoned in 2001, and several of its vacant buildings have been the target of arsonists.

==== Darlington, Maryland ====
Walter Cope designed more than a dozen residences in and around Darlington, Maryland.

- Gray Gables, Darlington, Maryland (1884)

== Gallery ==
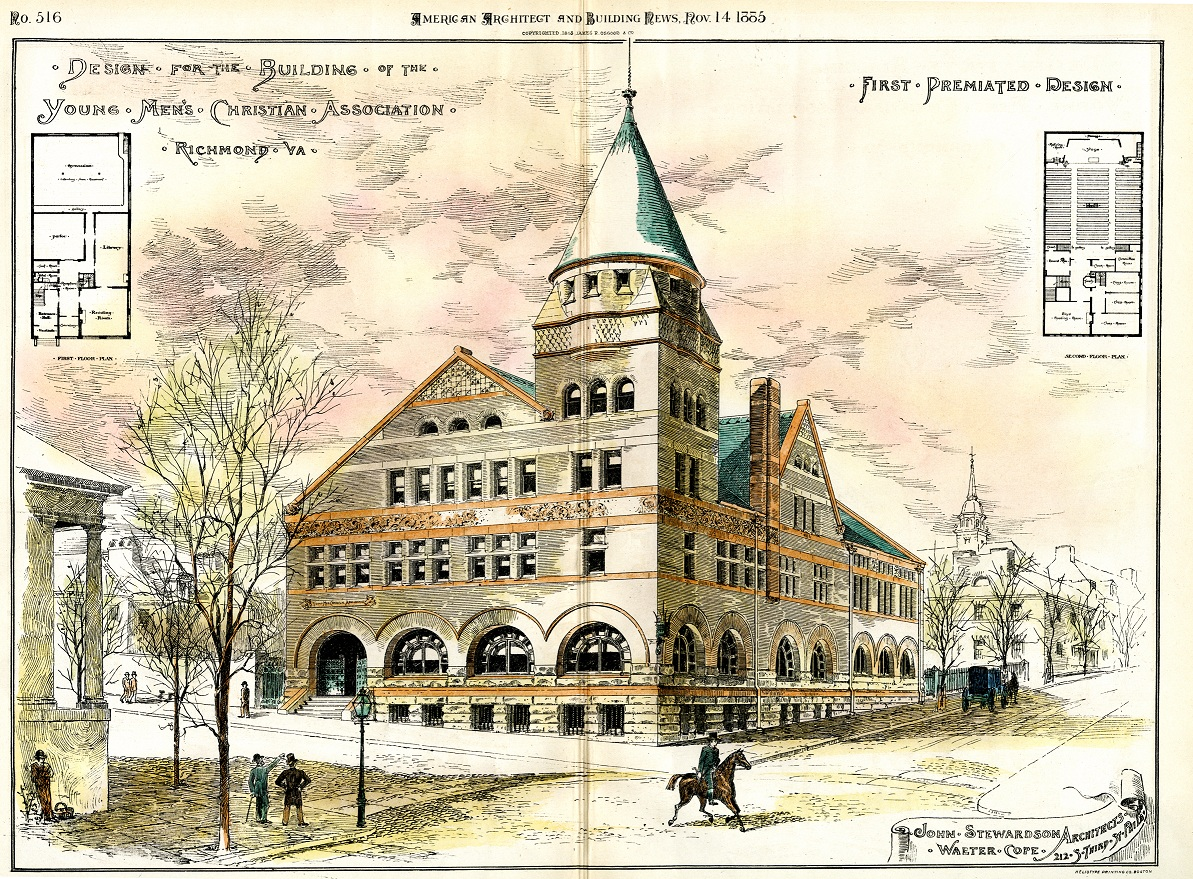
YMCA, Richmond, Virginia (1885–87, demolished)

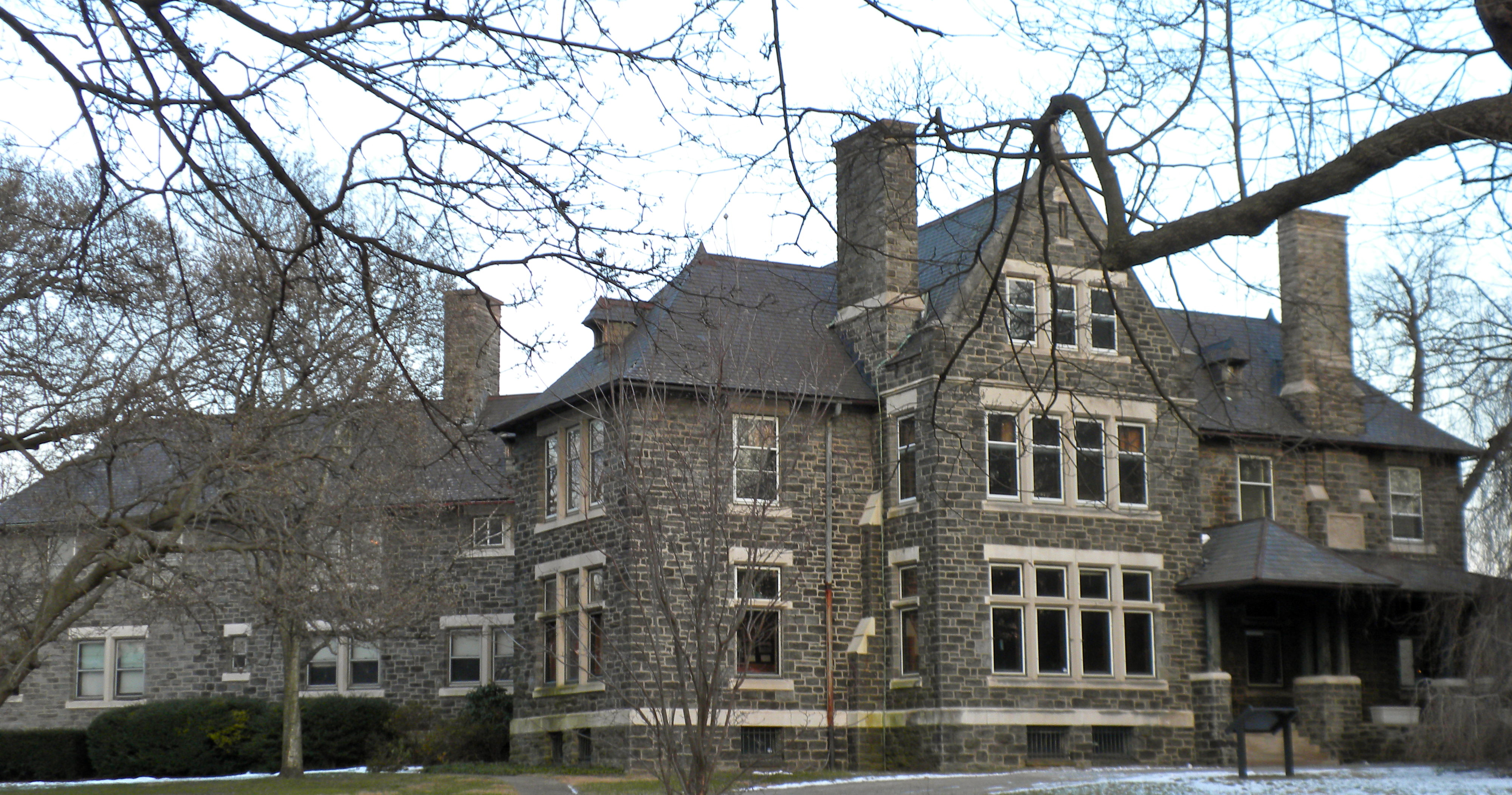
Graystone, Coatesville, Pennsylvania (1889)

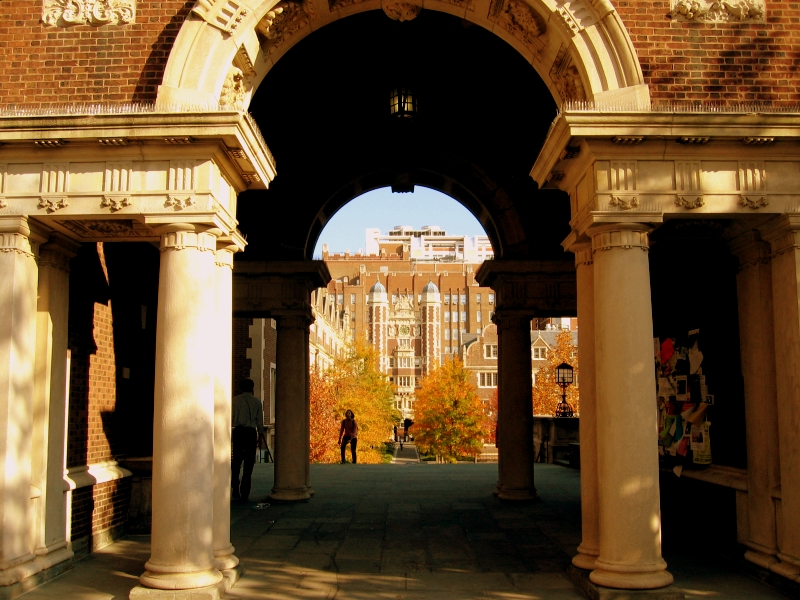
Quadrangle Dormitories, University of Pennsylvania (1895)

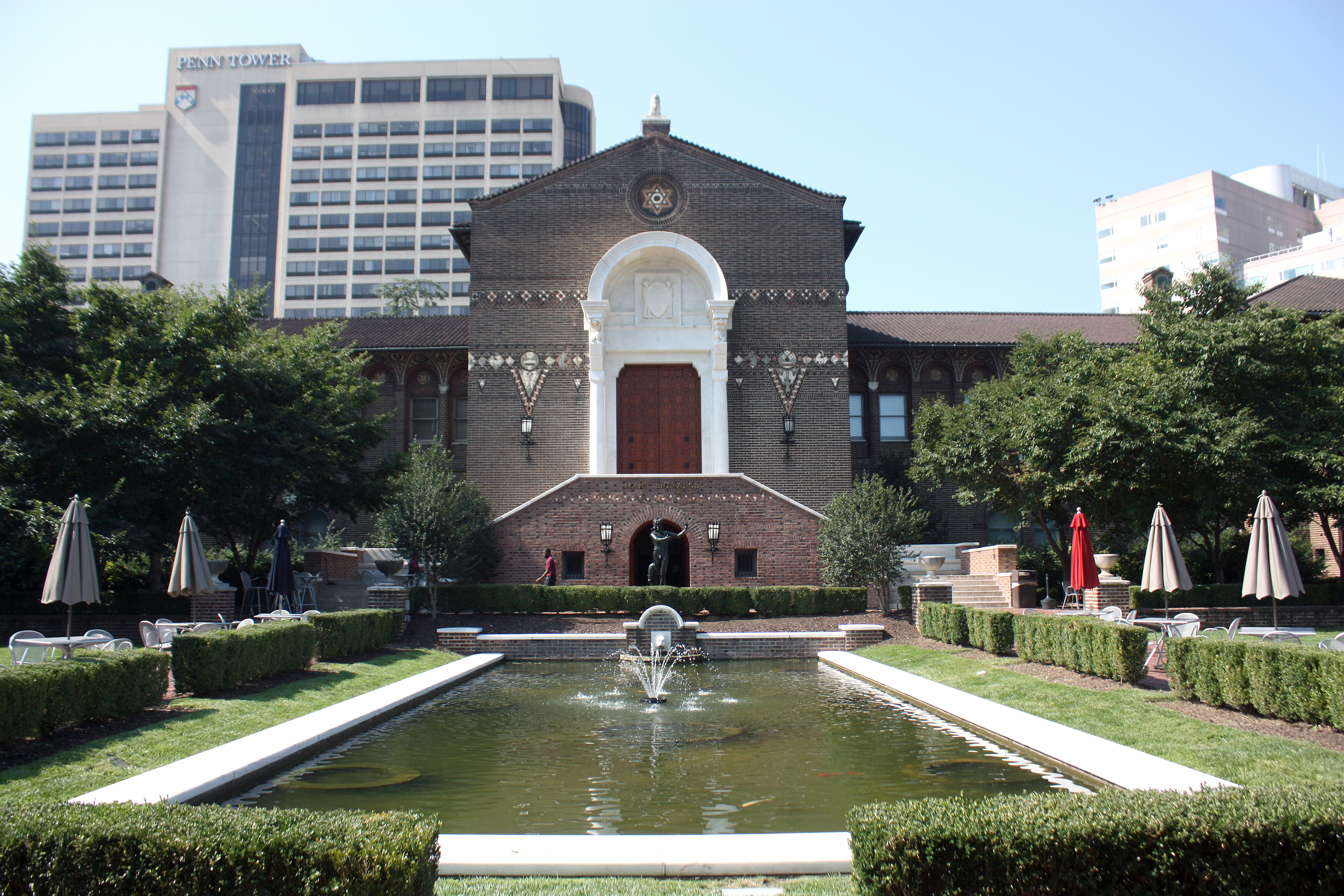
University of Pennsylvania Museum of Archaeology and Anthropology (1895–99), with Wilson Eyre and Frank Miles Day

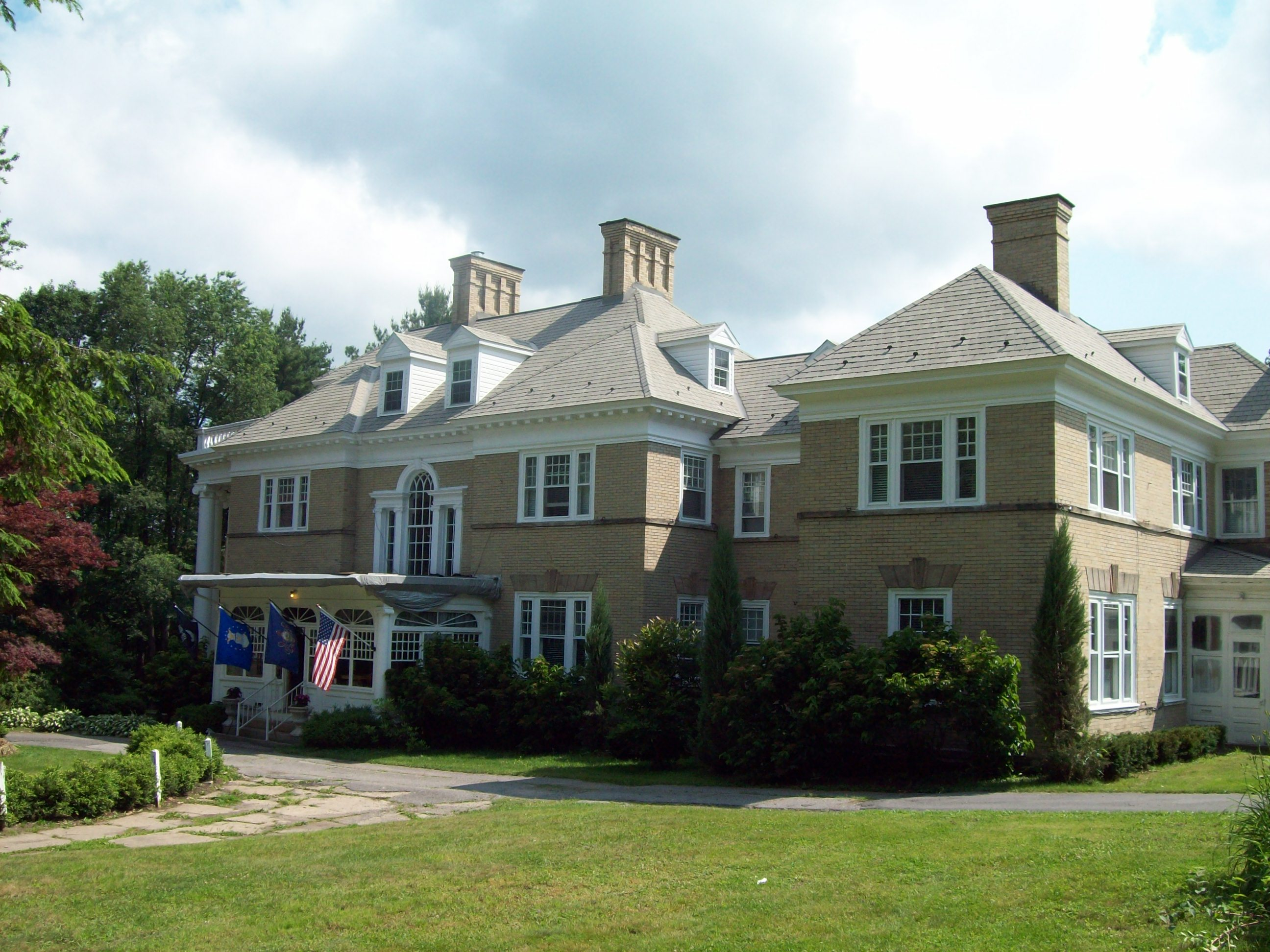
Anoatok, Kane, Pennsylvania (1896). Now Kane Manor Inn.

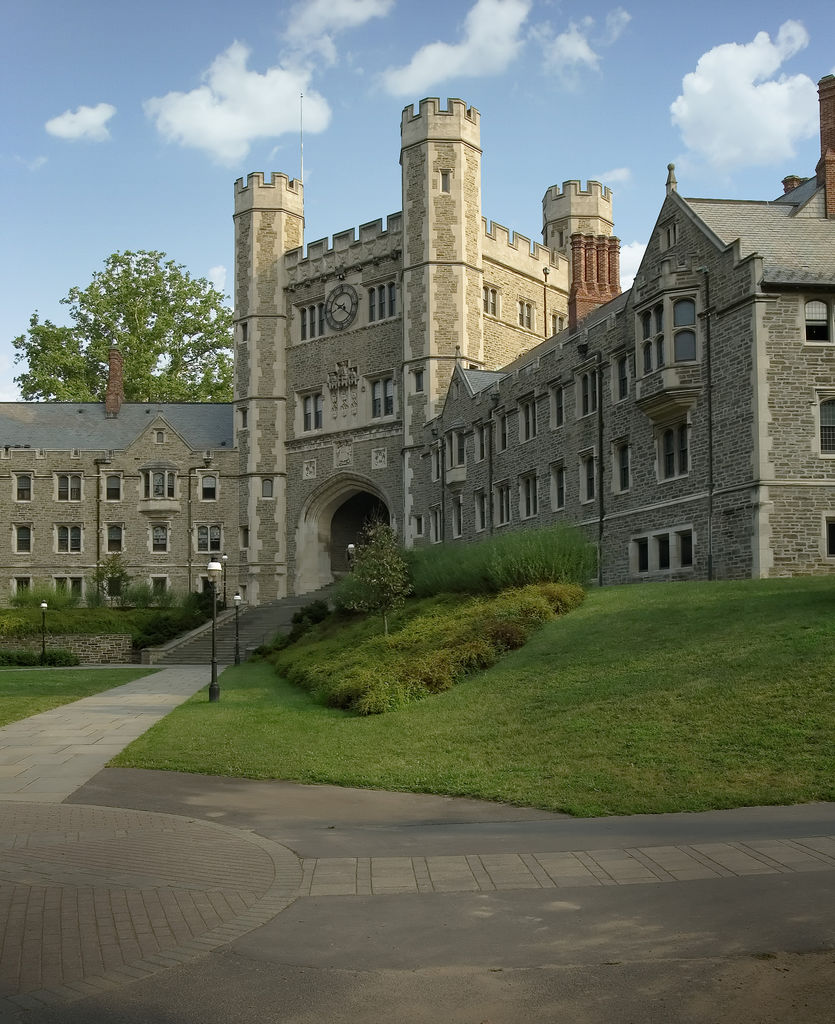
Blair Arch, Princeton University (1896)

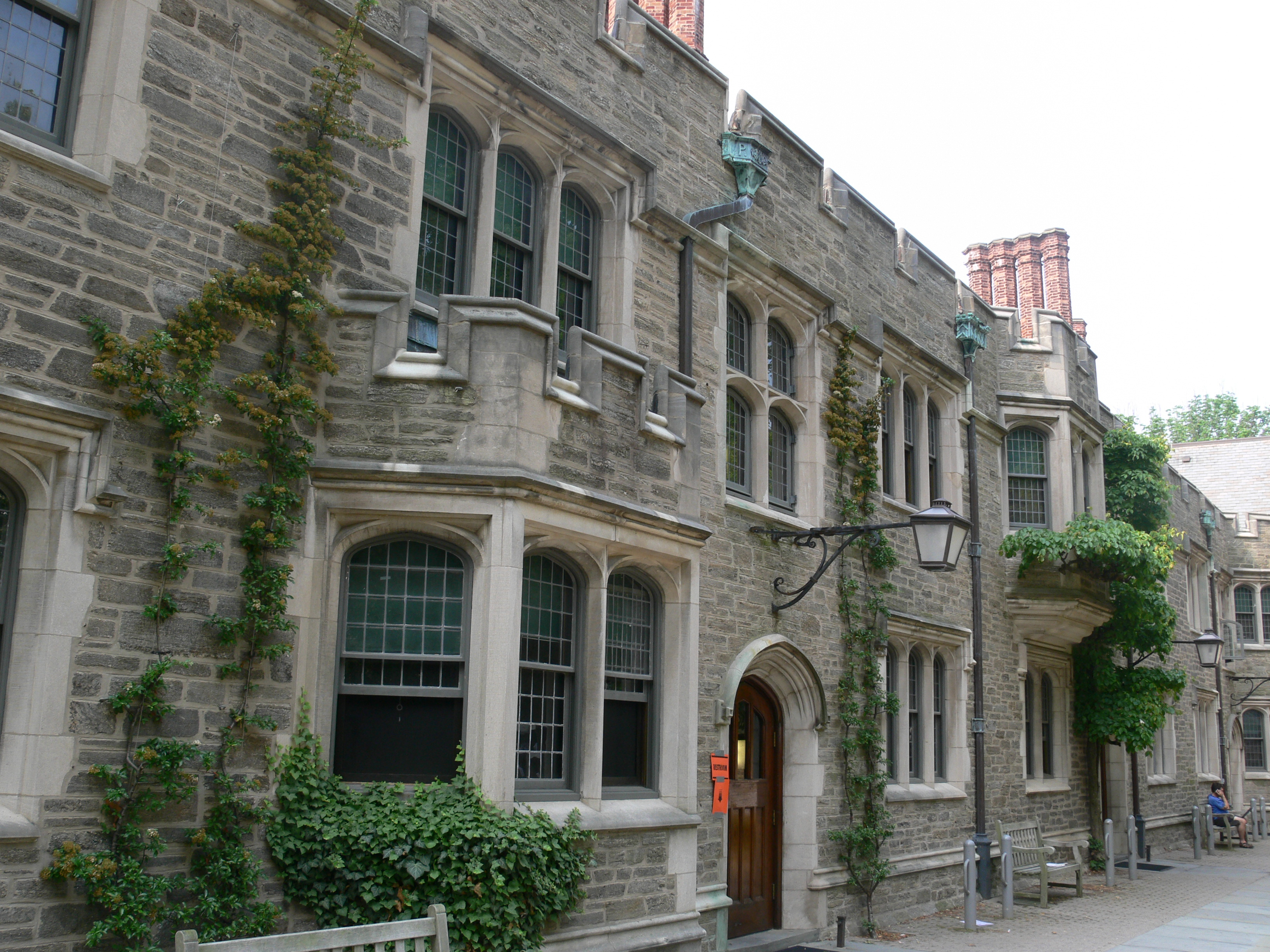
Buyers Hall, Princeton University (1896)

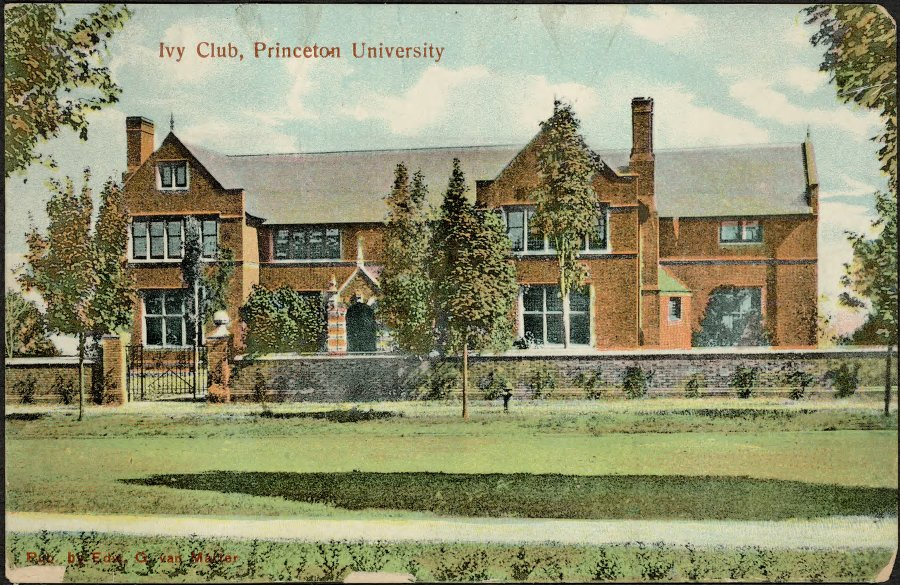
The Ivy Club, Princeton University (1897)

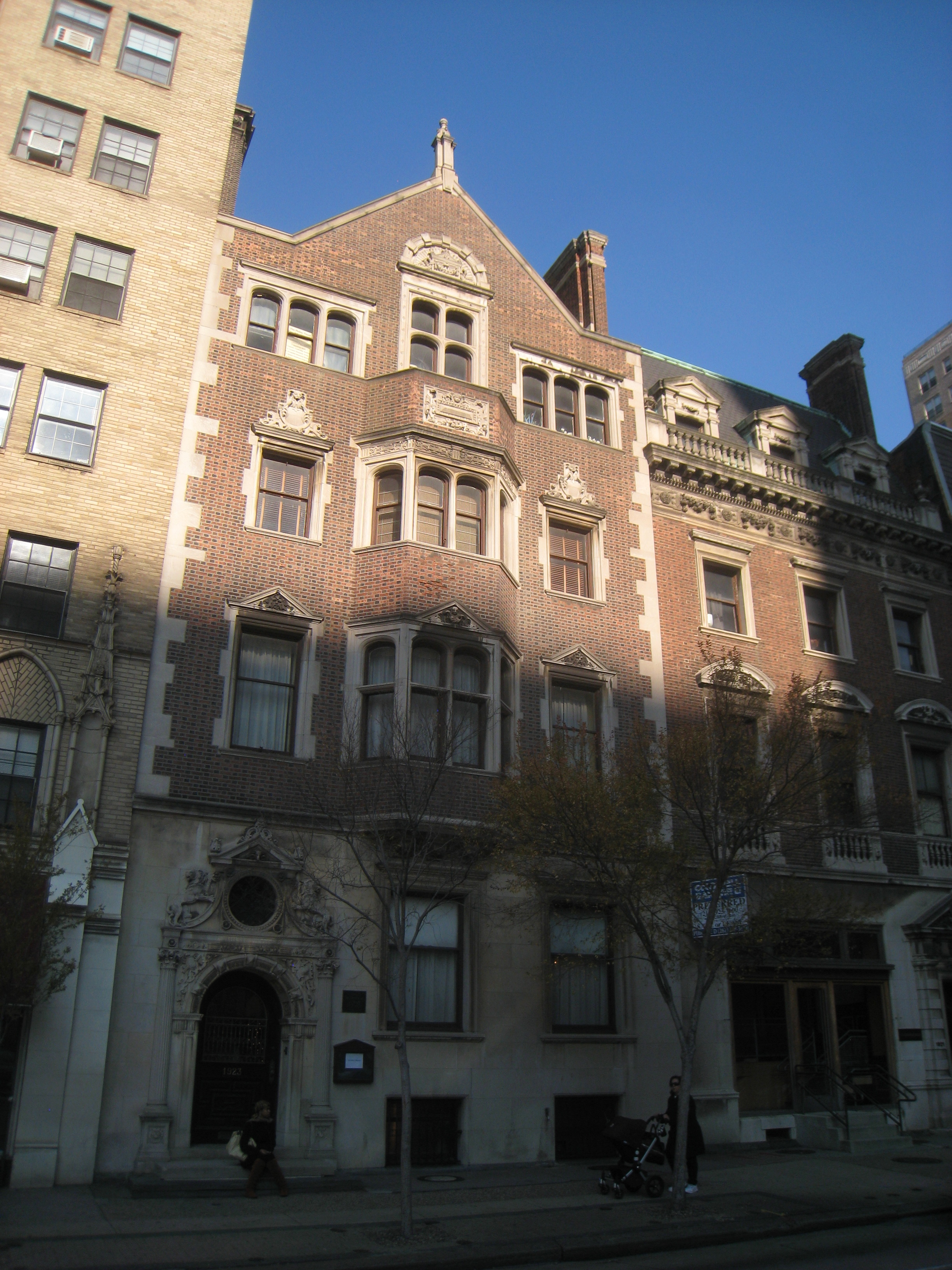
Catholic Philopatrian Literary Institute, Philadelphia (1897)

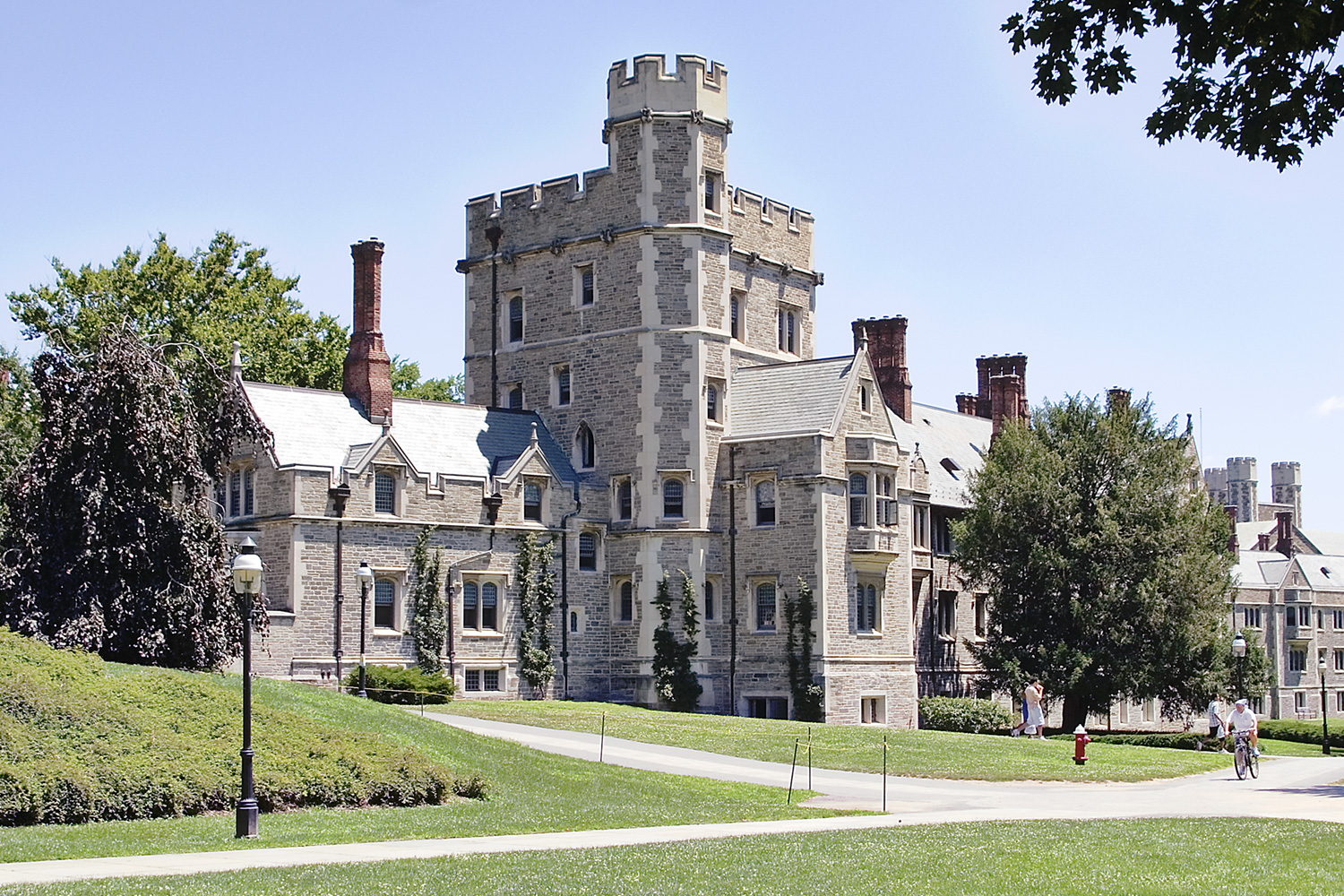
Stafford Little Hall, Princeton University (1898)

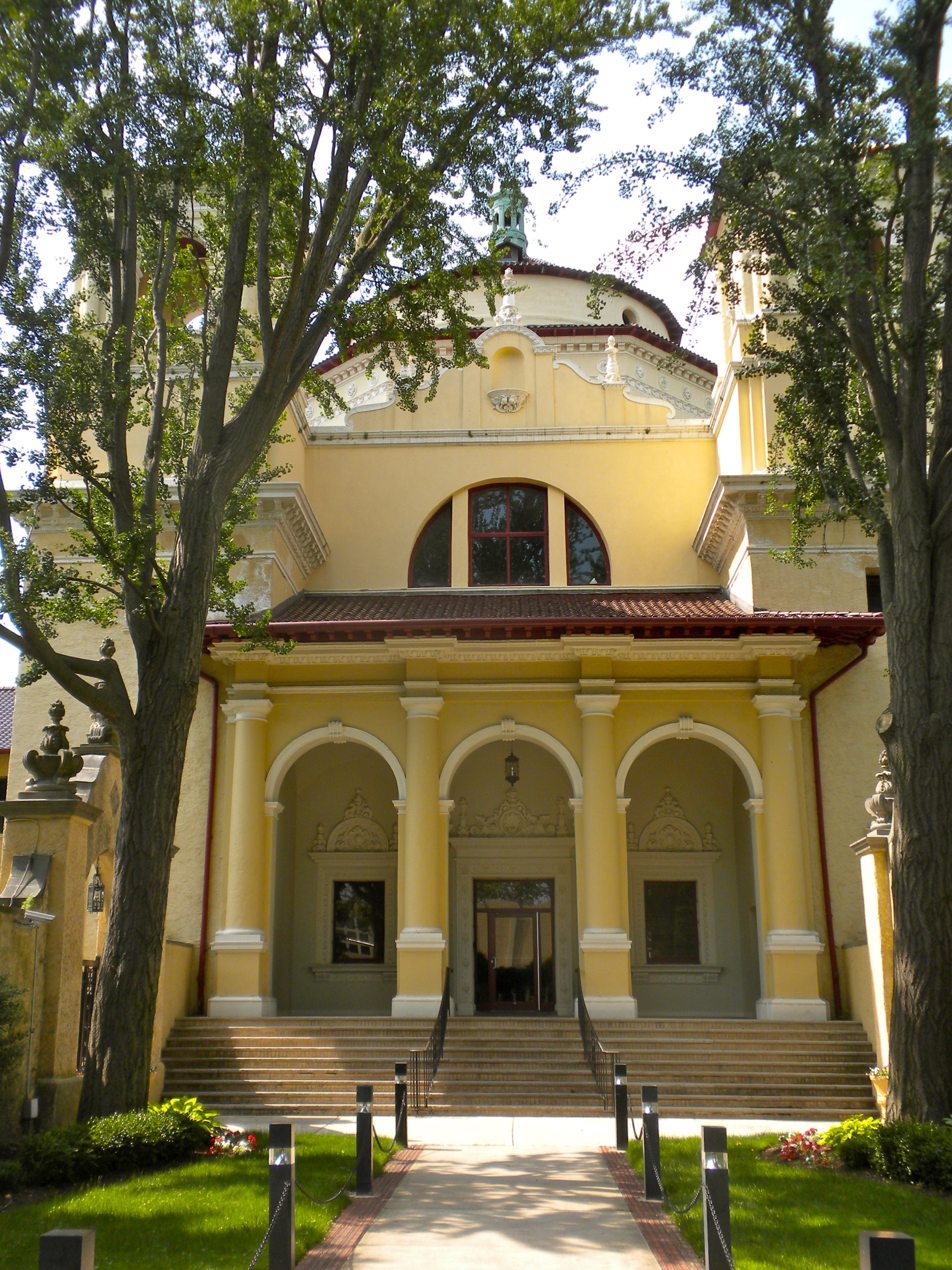
Overbrook School for the Blind, Philadelphia (1899)

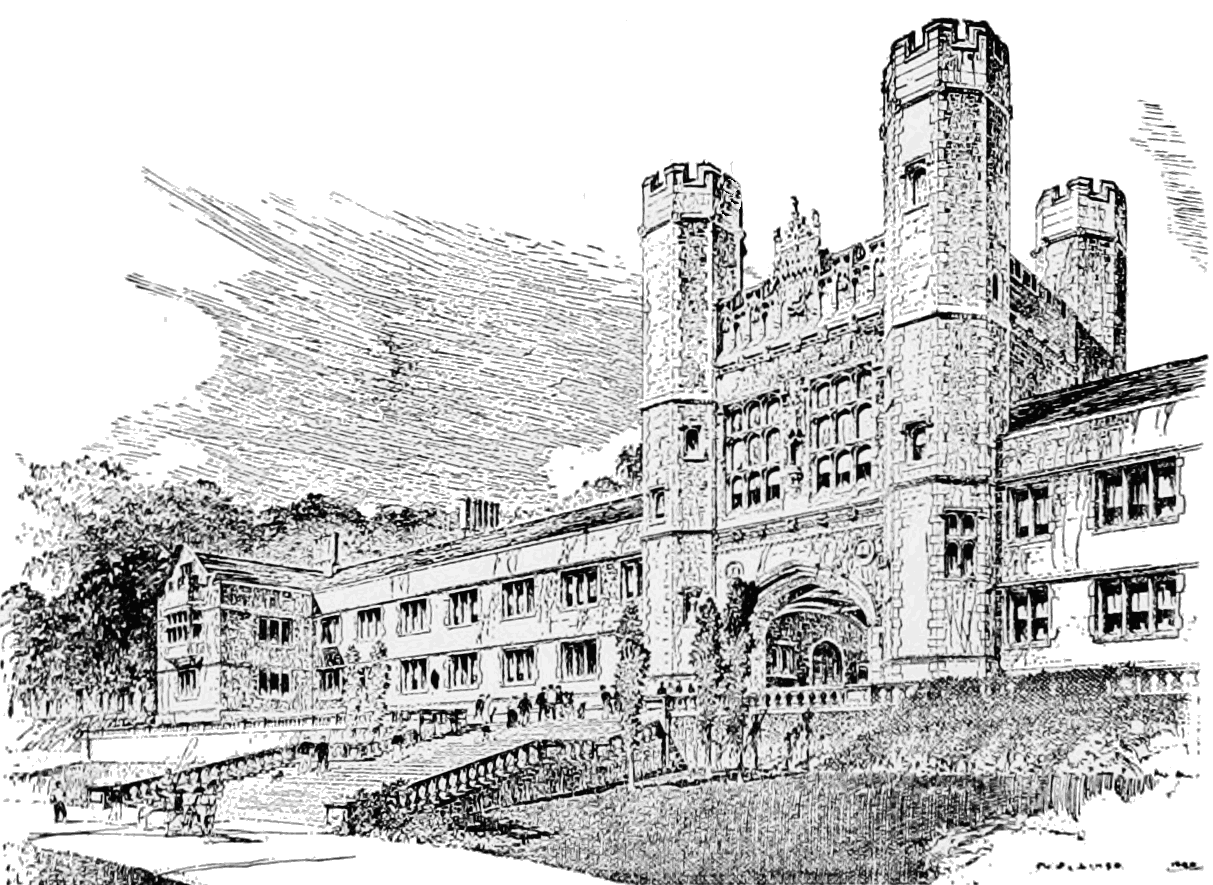
Brookings Hall, Washington University in St. Louis (1902)

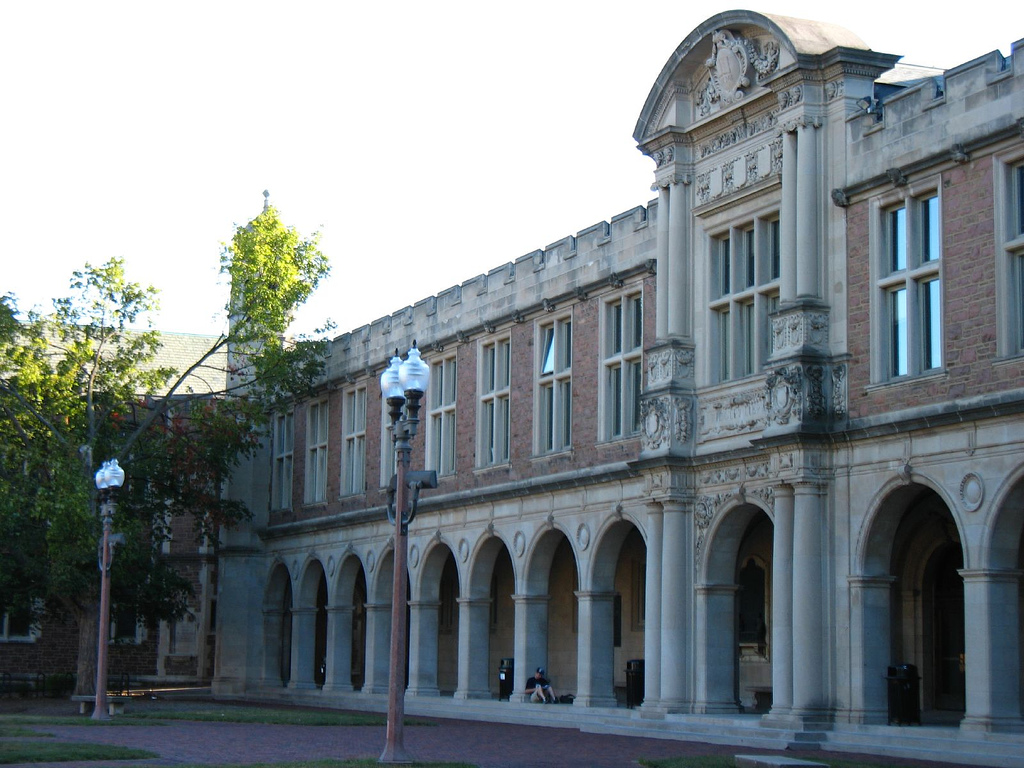
Ridgley Hall, Washington University in St. Louis (1902)

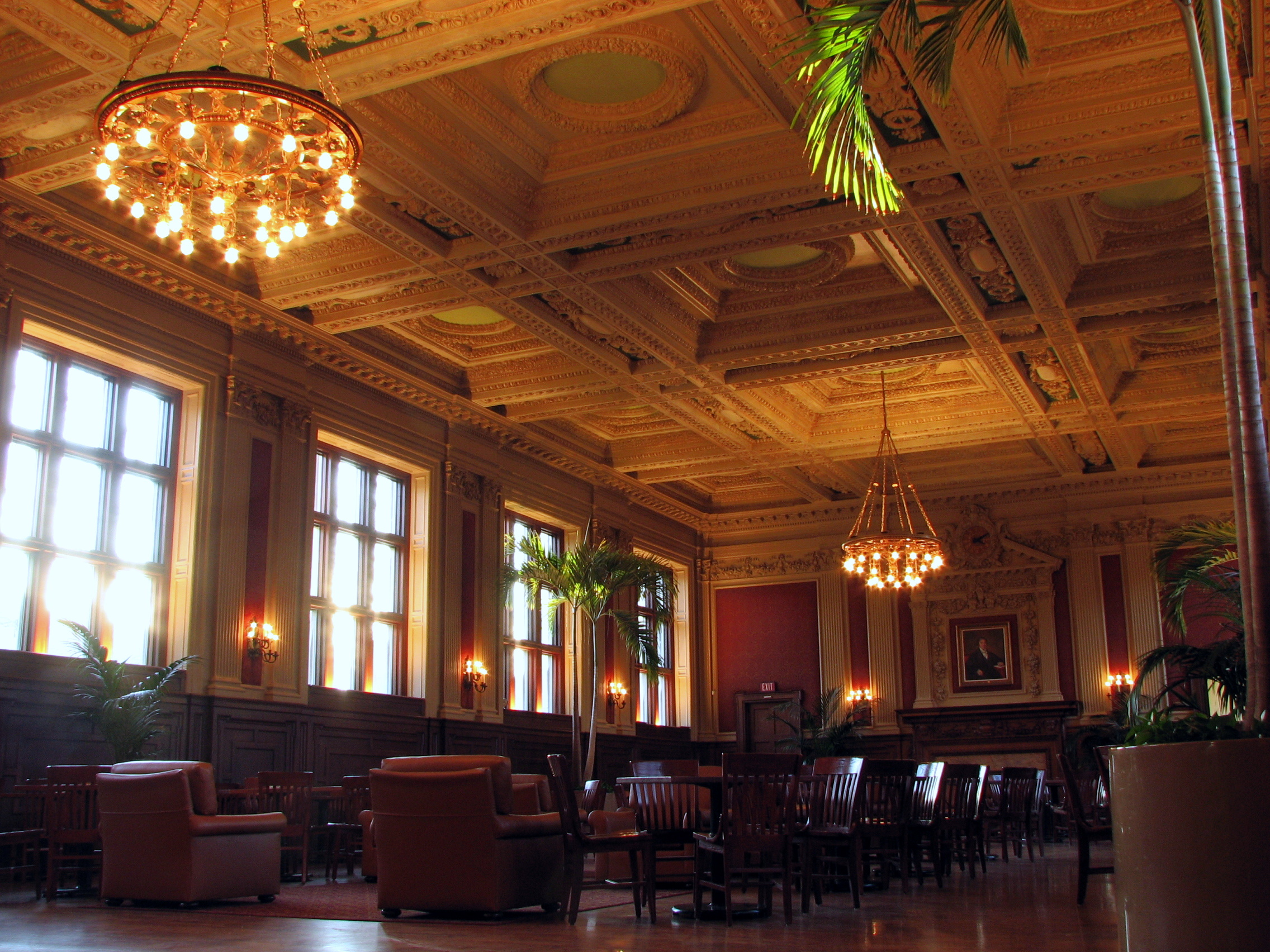
Holmes Lounge, Washington University in St. Louis (1902). Built as the university library.

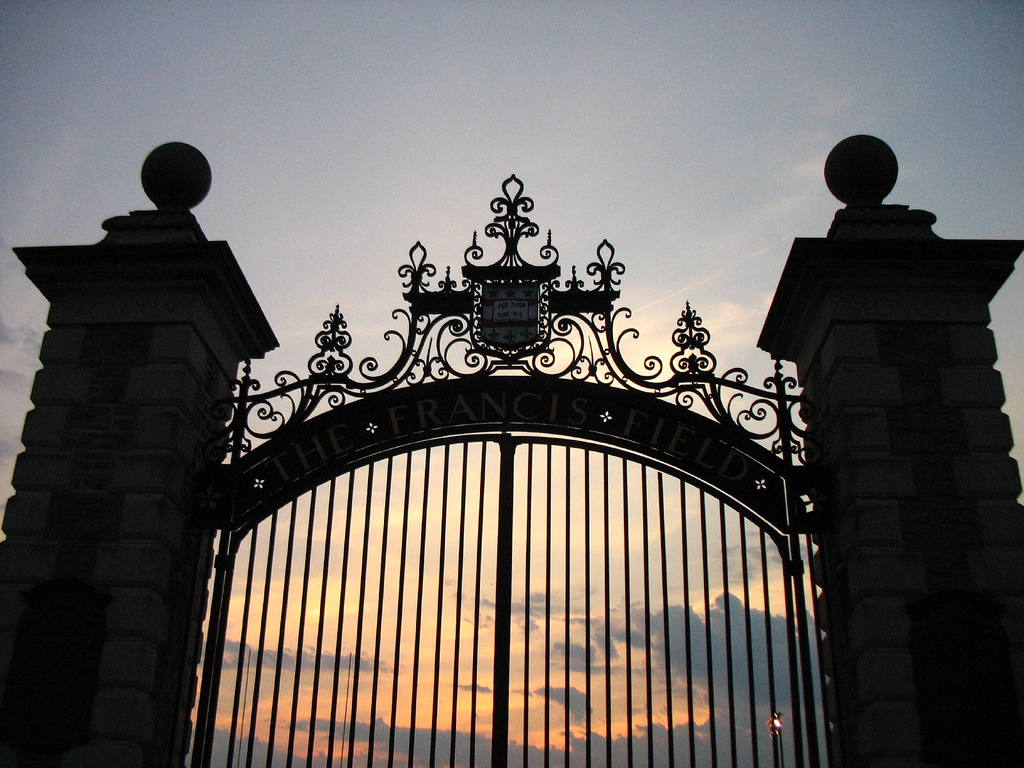
Francis Field Gateway, Washington University in St. Louis (1902)

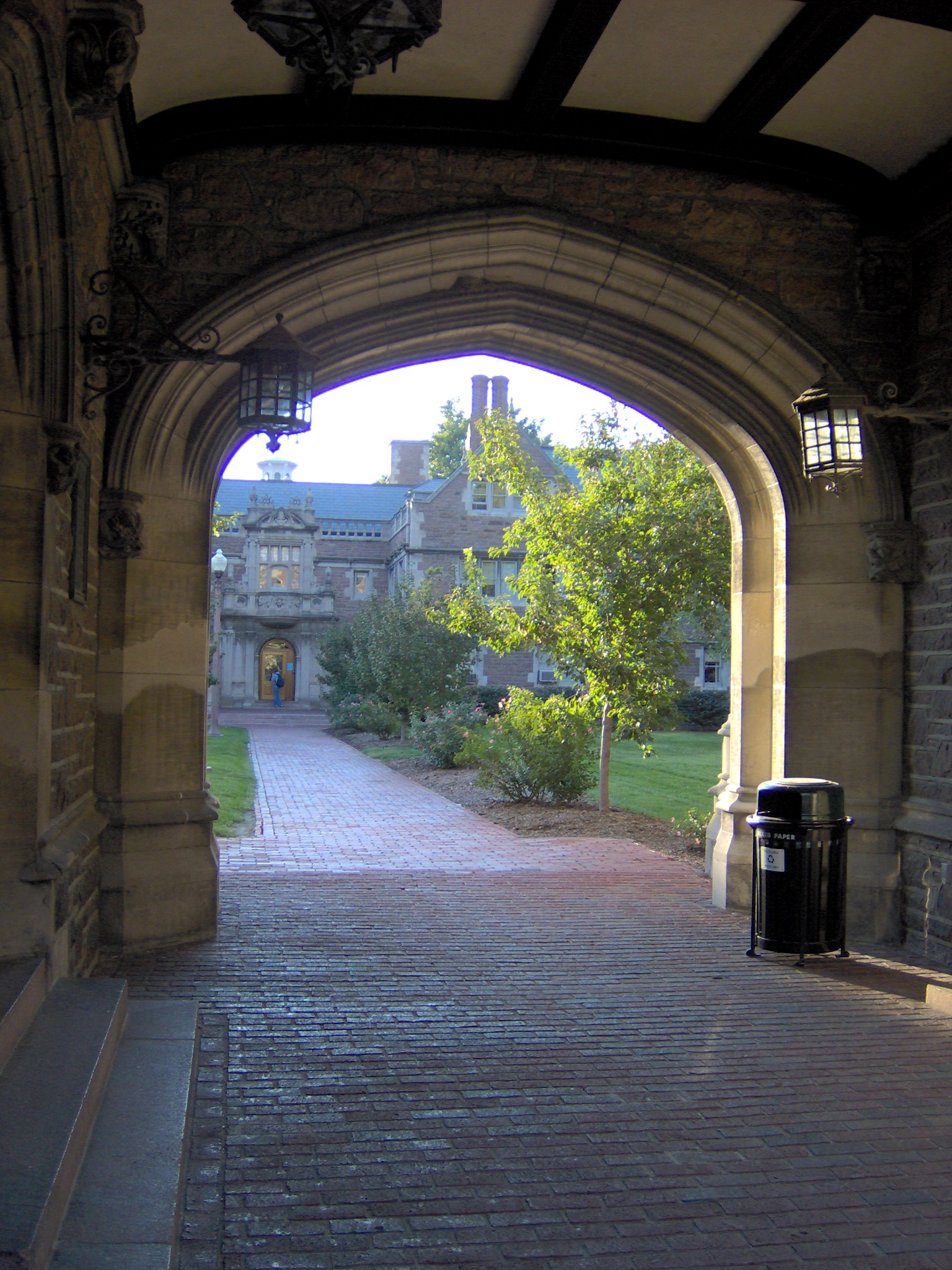
McMillan Hall, Washington University in St. Louis (1907)

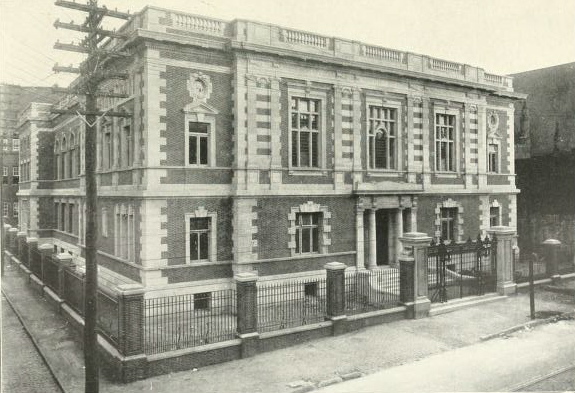
College of Physicians of Philadelphia (1909)
