= Bradford Downtown Historic District =

Historic district in Pennsylvania, United States

- U.S. National Register of Historic Places
- U.S. Historic district
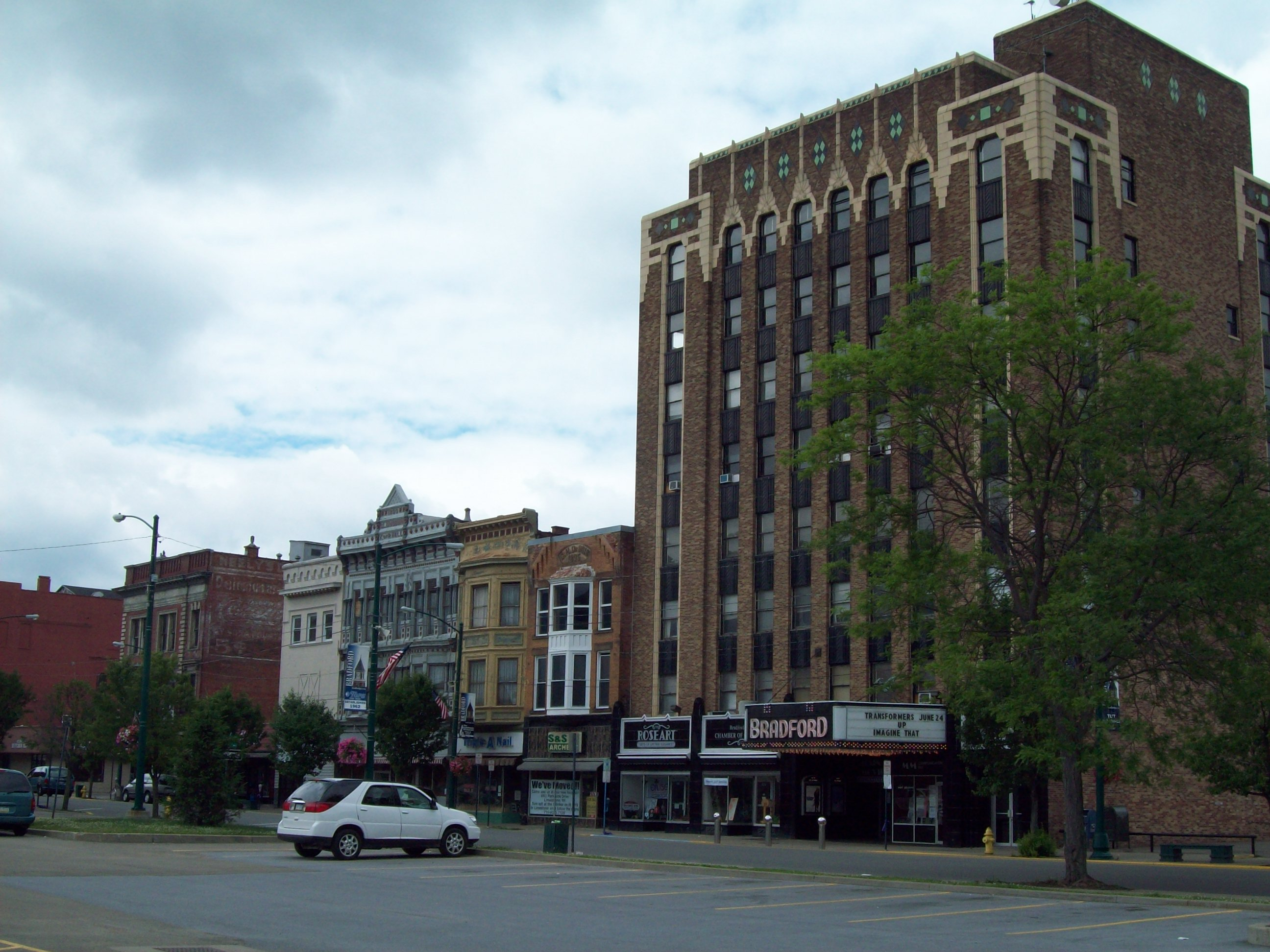
- Bradford Downtown Historic District, June 2009

- Location within Pennsylvania Location within the United States
- Location: Roughly bounded by Central Alley, Barbour St., Bushnell St., Howard Place, Davis St., and Boylston St., Bradford, Pennsylvania
- Coordinates: 41°57′20″N 78°39′2″W
- Area: 53 acres (21 ha)
- Built: 1879
- Architect: Enoch A. Curtis et al.
- Architectural style: Italianate, Romanesque, et al.
- MPS: Oil Industry Resources in Western Pennsylvania MPS
- NRHP reference No.: 00001044
- Added to NRHP: August 31, 2000

Bradford Downtown Historic District, is a national historic district in Bradford, McKean County, Pennsylvania, United States. It includes 136 contributing structures, mostly commercial buildings, and three structures otherwise listed on the National Register; Bradford Armory, Bradford Old City Hall, and the Rufus Barrett Stone House.

It was listed on the National Register of Historic Places in 2000.

== See also ==
- National Register of Historic Places listings in McKean County, Pennsylvania
