= National Register of Historic Places listings in McKean County, Pennsylvania =

Location of McKean County in Pennsylvania

This is a list of the National Register of Historic Places listings in McKean County, Pennsylvania.

This is intended to be a complete list of the properties and districts on the National Register of Historic Places in McKean County, Pennsylvania. The locations of National Register properties and districts for which the latitude and longitude coordinates are included below, may be seen in a map.

There are 10 properties and districts listed on the National Register in the county. Another property was once listed but has been removed.

This National Park Service list is complete through NPS recent listings posted May 1, 2026.

== Current listings ==
	Name on the Register	Image	Date listed	Location	City or town	Description
1	Anoatok	Anoatok	January 7, 1986 (#86000039)	230 Clay Street; 41°39′50″N 78°47′57″W	Kane	Georgian Colonial Revival style mansion constructed in 1896 for Dr. Elizabeth Dennistoun Wood Kane, wife of General Thomas L. Kane.
2	Rufus Barrett Stone House	Rufus Barrett Stone House	November 14, 1982 (#82001540)	11 Boylston Street; 41°57′24″N 78°39′01″W	Bradford	Three story brick flatiron building constructed in 1903.
3	Bradford Armory	Bradford Armory	May 9, 1991 (#91000508)	28 Barbour Street; 41°57′23″N 78°39′13″W	Bradford	Brick armory dating to 1912; part of the Multiple Property Submission for the Pennsylvania National Guard Armories.
4	Bradford Downtown Historic District	Bradford Downtown Historic District	August 31, 2000 (#00001044)	Roughly bounded by Central Alley, Barbour Street, Bushnell Street, Howard Place, Davis Street, and Boylston Street. 41°57′20″N 78°39′02″W	Bradford	Features a number of 19th-century Italianate style commercial structures.
5	Bradford Old City Hall	Bradford Old City Hall	May 17, 1976 (#76002156)	Kennedy and Boylston Streets; 41°57′24″N 78°38′50″W	Bradford	Eclectic Victorian city hall with four story clock tower.
6	Crook Farm	Crook Farm	March 26, 1976 (#76002157)	Northeast of Bradford on Seaward Avenue; 41°59′29″N 78°37′37″W	Foster Township	Includes farmstead dating to 1856, and site of Olmstead Well.
7	Kane Armory	Kane Armory	May 9, 1991 (#91000512)	Junction of Chestnut and Fraley Streets; 41°39′28″N 78°48′43″W	Kane	Brick armory dating to 1922-1929; part of the Multiple Property Submission for the Pennsylvania National Guard Armories.
8	Thomas L. Kane Memorial Chapel	Thomas L. Kane Memorial Chapel	March 29, 1978 (#78003089)	30 Chestnut Street; 41°39′28″N 78°48′32″W	Kane	Gothic Revival chapel constructed in 1876 and dedicated to General Thomas L. Kane.
9	Lynn Hall	Lynn Hall	February 7, 2007 (#07000033)	West side of U.S. Route 6, 1.5 miles (2.4 km) west of Port Allegany; 41°49′36″N 78°18′26″W	Liberty Township	Frank Lloyd Wright inspired restaurant and residence dating to 1935.
10	New Thomson House	New Thomson House	May 3, 1984 (#84003493)	2 Greeves Street; 41°39′33″N 78°48′39″W	Kane	Six story hotel constructed in 1907; now mixed use building.

== Former listing ==
	Name on the Register	Image	Date listed	Date removed	Location	City or town	Description
1	Kinzua Bridge	Kinzua Bridge	August 29, 1977 (#77001511)	July 21, 2004	4.2 miles (6.8 km) northeast of Mount Jewett; 41°45′45″N 78°35′18″W	Hamlin and Keating Townships	Destroyed by an F1 tornado on July 21, 2003.

== See also ==
- List of National Historic Landmarks in Pennsylvania
- National Register of Historic Places listings in Pennsylvania
- List of Pennsylvania state historical markers in McKean County
