= List of Pennsylvania state historical markers in McKean County =

Location of McKean County in Pennsylvania

This is a list of the Pennsylvania state historical markers in McKean County.

This is intended to be a complete list of the official state historical markers placed in McKean County, Pennsylvania by the Pennsylvania Historical and Museum Commission (PHMC). The locations of the historical markers, as well as the latitude and longitude coordinates as provided by the PHMC's database, are included below when available. There are 16 historical markers located in McKean County.

== Historical markers ==
Marker title	Image	Date dedicated	Location	Marker type	Topics
Allegheny Portage		August 10, 1949	Junction US 6 & PA 155, Port Allegany; 41.80578°N 78.27753°W	Roadside	Native American, Navigation, Paths & Trails, Transportation
Bradford Oil Refinery		September 9, 2006	At refinery entrance, 77 North Kendall Avenue & Brad Penn Way, Bradford; 41.96698°N 78.62797°W	Roadside	Business & Industry, Oil & Gas
Bucktails, The		August 8, 1949	Grand Army of the Republic Highway (US 6) at courthouse, Smethport; 41.80958°N 78.44723°W	Roadside	Civil War, Military
Ceres		August 8, 1949	PA 44 at bridge, Ceres; 41.998717°N 78.268767°W	Roadside	Ethnic & Immigration
Dr. Edward H. McCleery		July 23, 2016	At former Wolf Park site, Grand Army of the Republic (US 6) near Wolf Farm Road, east of Kane; 41.687248°N 78.719356°W	Roadside	Environment
Holley Motor Company		September 13, 2008	57 Holley Avenue & Hoffman Avenue, Bradford; 41.969183°N 78.627500°W	City	Business & Industry, Military
Kinzua Viaduct		August 15, 1982	Kinzua Bridge State Park, off SR 3011, 3.5 miles northeast of Mount Jewett (Missing as of 7-23-04)(rededicated 2011); 41.759336°N 78.586914°W	Roadside	Business & Industry, Transportation
McKean County		October 14, 1981	County Courthouse, 500 West Main Street (US 6), Smethport; 41.80968°N 78.44723°W	City	Government & Politics, Government & Politics 19th Century, Oil & Gas
Mt. Equity Plantation		August 11, 1949	Turtle Point-Larabee Road (PA 155), near Rock Run Road, just northwest of Turtlepoint; 41.87838°N 78.34863°W	Roadside	Government & Politics, Government & Politics 19th Century
Port Allegany		October 12, 1948	Grand Army of the Republic Highway (US 6), west edge of Port Allegany; 41.819428°N 78.289553°W	Roadside	Business & Industry, Cities & Towns, Early Settlement, Transportation
Port Allegany		October 12, 1948	In park, Grand Army of the Republic Highway (US 6) between Maple and West Mill Streets, Port Allegany; 41.811176°N 78.280581°W	Roadside	Business & Industry, Cities & Towns, Early Settlement, Transportation
Seneca Spring		September 28, 1951	Brickyard Road (PA 321) near Hemlock Avenue, S of Kane; 41.65785°N 78.80035°W	Roadside	Environment, Native American, Transportation
Smethport		August 8, 1949	At courthouse, 500 West Main Street (US 6), Smethport; 41.80958°N 78.44748°W	Roadside	Cities & Towns, Government & Politics 19th Century
St. Mary's Church		July 7, 1985	At church, Newell Creek Road, off PA 155 northeast of Turtlepoint; 41.902850°N 78.338867°W	Roadside	Ethnic & Immigration, Religion
Thomas L. Kane		June 29, 1980	30 Chestnut Street (Thomas L. Kane Memorial Chapel), Kane; 41.657750°N 78.808750°W	City	Civil War, Military, Religion
Tidewater Pipe Co.		August 8, 1949	Farmers Valley-Eldred Road, Coryville; 41.882500°N 78.398433°W	Roadside	Business & Industry, Oil & Gas, Transportation

== See also ==
- List of Pennsylvania state historical markers
- National Register of Historic Places listings in McKean County, Pennsylvania
