= Edith Dobie =

American historian (1887–1975)

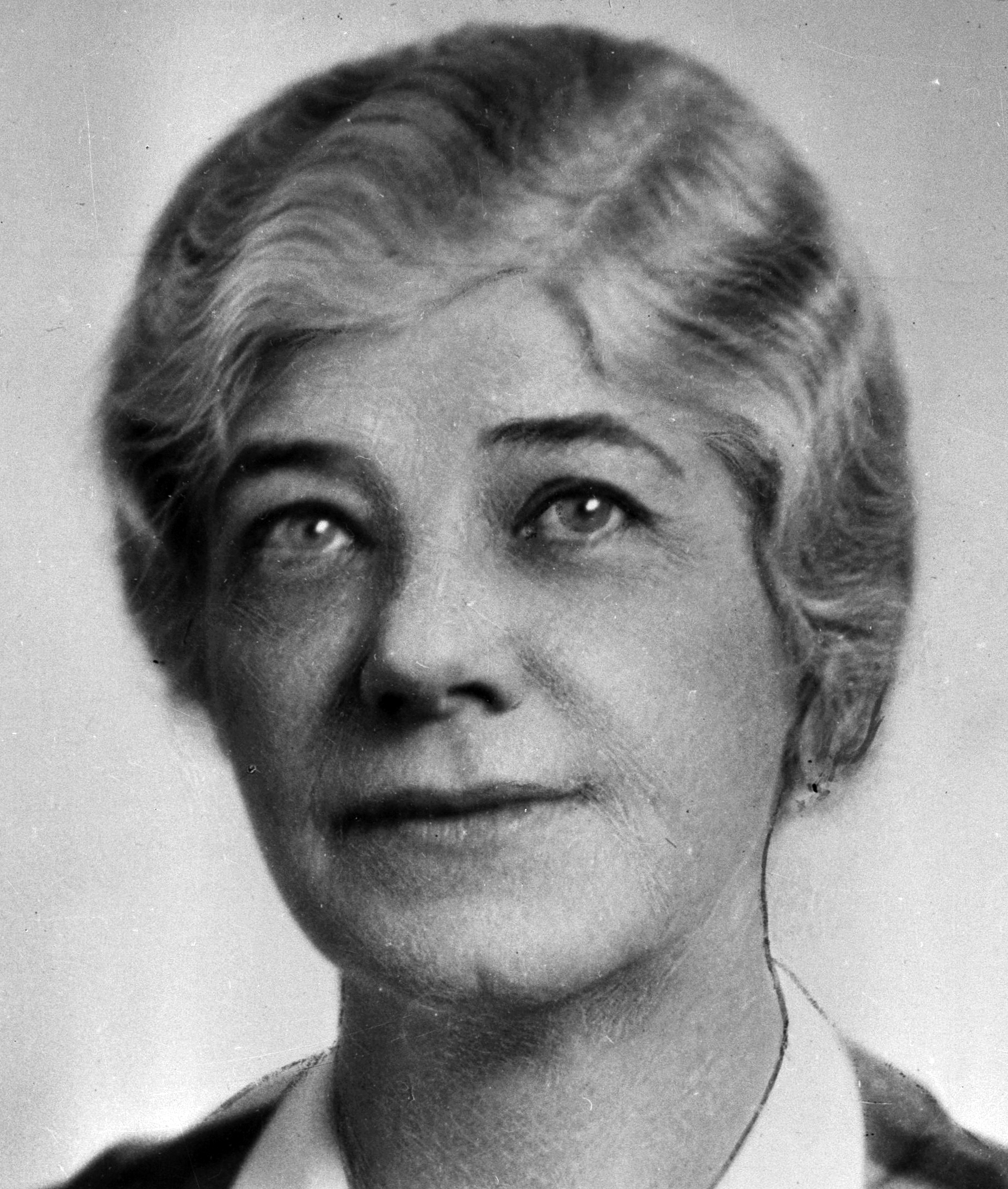
- Dobie in 1938
- Born: 10 February 1887; Bradford, Pennsylvania
- Died: 24 April 1975 (aged 88); Seattle, Washington
- Education: Syracuse University (A.B.); University of Chicago (M.A.); Leland Stanford Junior University (Ph.D)
- Occupation: Historian

Edith Dobie (10 February 1887 – 24 April 1975) was an American historian of Great Britain.

== Life ==
Edith Dobie was born in Bradford, Pennsylvania on 10 February 1887. She finished high school in 1903 and then taught school, including in the Bradford Public Schools. She was awarded her A.B. from Syracuse University in 1914, becoming an instructor in history at Cortland Teachers College. Four years later Dobie was a history instructor at Westfield State Teachers College, in Westfield, Massachusetts, and in 1920 she became a history instructor at the New Jersey State Normal School in Trenton. In 1922 Dobie received an M.A. from the University of Chicago and became an associate professor of history at Wesleyan College in Macon, Georgia. Four years later, she earned her Ph.D. from Leland Stanford Junior University. In 1926 Dobie was hired as an instructor in history at the University of Washington and remained there until her retirement as a full professor in 1957. That same year she died in Seattle, Washington, on 24 April.

== Publications ==
In 1927 Dobie published The Political Career of Stephen Mallory White: A Study of Party Activities Under the Convention System and she followed that with Problems in International Understanding in 1928. She contributed to If Men Want Peace in 1946 and wrote The Historiography of the British Empire-Commonwealth twenty years later and Malta’s Road to Independence in 1967.
