= Henry Clinton Hunt =

American politician

Henry Clinton Hunt was a member of the Wisconsin State Assembly. He represented the Sauk 2nd District in the Assembly as a Democrat during his terms.

== Biography ==
Hunt was born on January 27, 1840, in Bradford, Pennsylvania. After residing in Limestone, New York, from 1848 to 1854, he settled in Reedsburg, Wisconsin. During the American Civil War, he served with the 20th Illinois Volunteer Infantry Regiment of the Union Army, achieving the rank of sergeant. Events Hunt took part in include the Battle of Fredericktown, the Battle of Fort Henry and the Battle of Shiloh. He was a merchant by trade. Hunt died in 1908.

== Political career ==
Hunt was a member of the Assembly during the 1891 and 1893 sessions. Other positions he held include postmaster, town treasurer and member of the village board (similar to city council) of Reedsburg, now a city. He was a Democrat.
