= Kanesville Tabernacle =

Former religious meetinghouse in Council Bluffs, Iowa, U.S.

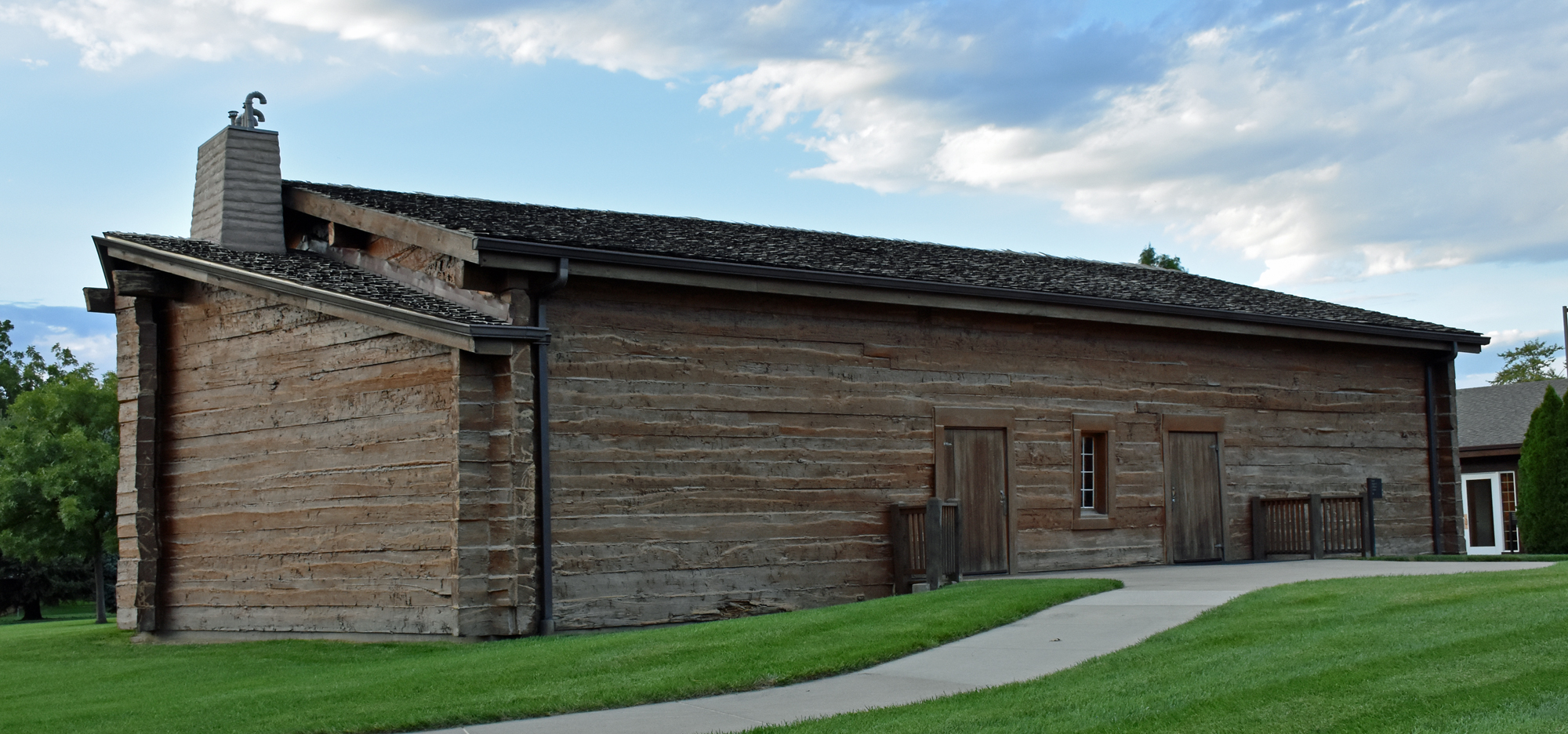
A replica of the Kanesville Tabernacle, which stood near the location of the original (1996–2022).

The Kanesville Tabernacle was a large, hastily constructed log building in Council Bluffs, Iowa that was created specifically for the event of the reorganization of the First Presidency of the Church of Jesus Christ of Latter-day Saints (LDS Church) in late 1847. Council Bluffs, or Kanesville (as it was called at the time), served as a temporary settlement for the displaced church and its membership.

In 1996, a replica of the tabernacle was built near the original site. For approximately two decades, the replica was operated as a historic site of the church, until it was deemed unsafe and torn down in 2022. In September 2024, the church dedicated the Kanesville Memorial in its place.

== Context ==
With the death of Joseph Smith on June 27, 1844, the First Presidency of the Latter Day Saint church was dissolved. The leadership of the church was taken on by the Quorum of the Twelve Apostles with Brigham Young, the president of the quorum, taking on the main leadership role. By 1845 it became apparent to the church leaders in Nauvoo, Illinois. that the violence against the members of the church would not abate. Consequently, they began to make plans to evacuate Nauvoo and migrate to the Rocky Mountains where they hoped to establish church headquarters and practice their religion in relative isolation and peace. Originally they planned to leave Nauvoo in April 1846.

Ongoing concerns about their safety and their ability to leave Nauvoo led church leaders on February 2, 1846, to meet to discuss their situation. Two days later on February 4, 1846, a large group left the town. The journey across southern Iowa was difficult due to inclement weather and incessantly muddy roads. The journey took the better part of three and half months and left the members of the church bereft of provisions, fatigued, and sickly. They settled in the territory of the Omaha Tribe on the west bank of the Missouri River as well the east bank of the river in Council Bluffs. They called the area Kanesville in honor Thomas L. Kane, an attorney, friend and advocate for the Latter-day Saints. Kane assisted the church leaders in negotiating an agreement that allowed them to establish a provisioning base in the territory of the Omaha tribe known as Winter Quarters. In the spring of 1847, Young led the first group of Mormon pioneers to the Salt Lake Valley, arriving in the valley on July 24, 1847. Many of the pioneers stayed in the Salt Lake Valley, planting crops, preparing homes, and starting the settlement that would grow into Salt Lake City. Young, however, quickly returned to Winter Quarters (near present-day Florence, Nebraska) to organize the remainder of the pioneers in preparation for their trek and to deal with a few business items.

== Tabernacle history ==
=== Construction ===
One of the items of business that Young wanted to accomplish was the reorganization of the First Presidency of the church. Since Joseph Smith's death, the First Presidency had not existed, and Young believed it was finally time to reorganize it. In anticipation of the event, the LDS Church leaders felt it necessary and appropriate to construct a hall large enough to accommodate the large number of Latter-Day Saints who would want to witness the event. With this end in mind, approximately 200 Mormon pioneers spent two and a half weeks building the large log-cabin like hall. The dimensions of the building were 40 feet by 60 feet with a large sod-block fireplace and chimney located at one end. In the center of the wall opposite the entrance, there was a small wing that provided a stage upon which the church leaders could sit and conduct the meeting. It was here on December 27, 1847, with 1,000 people in attendance that Brigham Young, Heber C. Kimball, and Willard Richards were sustained by members of the church as the new First Presidency, and Young was sustained as the second president of the church.

=== Destruction ===
Another important event that took place in this building was the reconciliation of Oliver Cowdery, who had been excommunicated in Missouri in 1838, with the leadership of the church. Shortly after the building's construction, it became apparent that it had been built over the top of a spring and the base of the building was rotting. Having served its purpose the building was torn down two years after its completion.

=== Replica ===
A replica of the Kanesville Tabernacle was constructed in the mid-1990s. The reconstruction was not directed or financed by the LDS Church, but rather by the Pottawattamie County Mormon Trails Association and Kanesville Restoration, Inc. Major financial backers for the replica were Bill & Patricia Ann Child and Mont & Viola Nelson; Bob Schulze directed the building program. The replica, which sat less than a block from the site of the original tabernacle, was dedicated by Church President Gordon B. Hinckley on July 13, 1996. In 1999, the tabernacle was donated to the Church and served as an official visitors' center.

Like the original tabernacle, the replica was built from cottonwood. The wood shrank two inches in the first two months and was anticipated to shrink another ten inches over the first five years of its life. To counteract this, the church placed jacks under the main supports that could be lowered as the walls shrank. The replica was torn down beginning April 4, 2022, after the structure had been deemed unsafe and closed a few years prior.

== Kanesville Memorial ==
The site of the demolished replica was dedicated as the Kanesville Memorial on September 28, 2024, by Elder Kyle S. McKay, Church Historian and Recorder. The memorial includes a large garden with native landscaping, filled with sculptures and monuments. These artworks, together with historical waysides/signage, commemorate the historical events related to the church in the area. These events include the mustering of the Mormon Battalion (with an emphasis on remembering the families of these soldiers who were left behind in Kanesville), the reorganization of the First Presidency, and former-church leader Oliver Cowdery returning to the faith.
