= New Thomson House =

- U.S. National Register of Historic Places
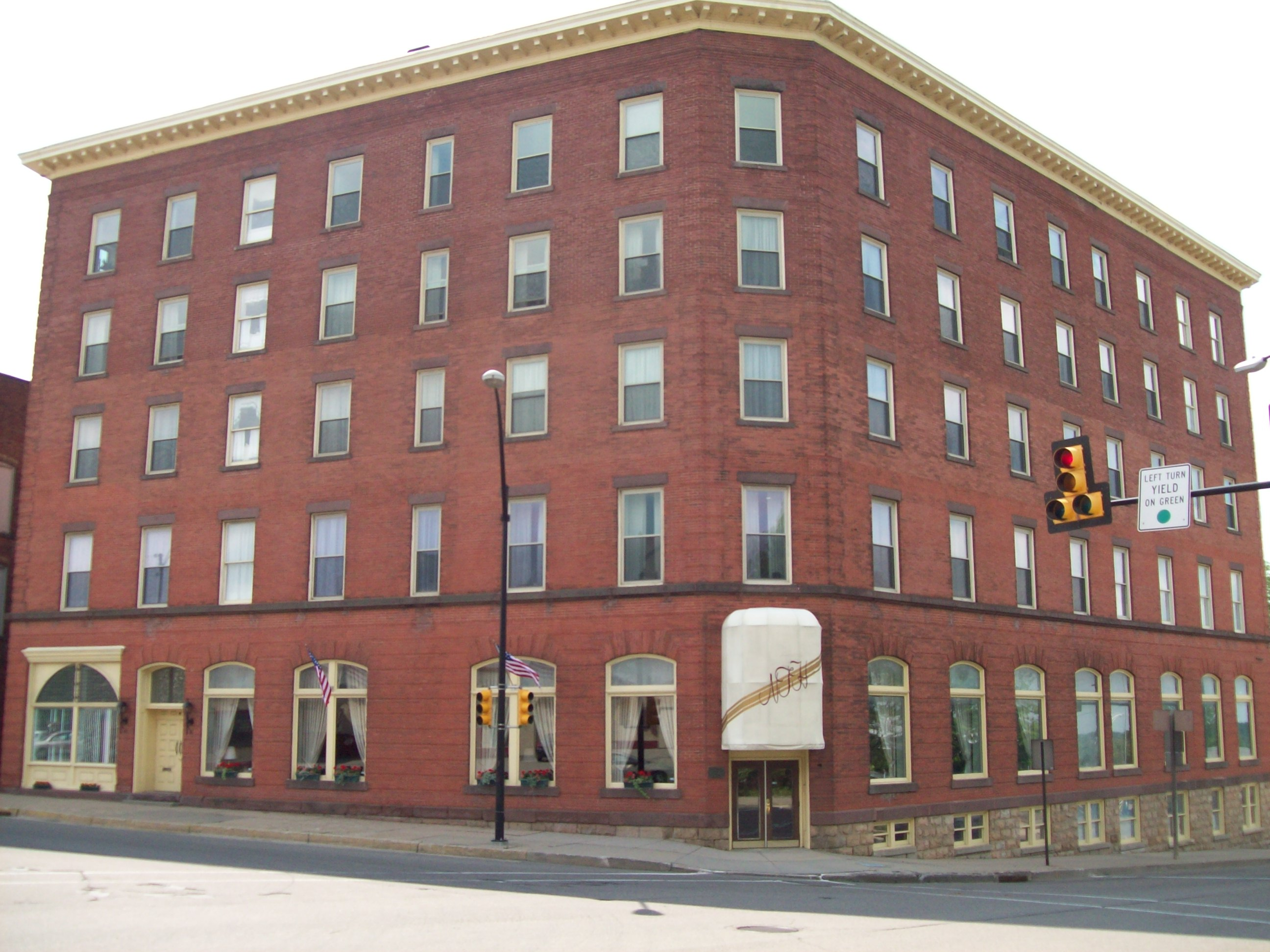
- New Thomson House, June 2009

- Location within Pennsylvania Location within the United States
- Location: 2 Greeves St., Kane, Pennsylvania
- Coordinates: 41°39′38″N 78°48′35″W
- Built: 1907
- Architect: Fleming, John
- NRHP reference No.: 84003493
- Added to NRHP: May 03, 1984

New Thomson House, also known as the Penn-Kane Hotel, is a historic hotel located in Kane, Pennsylvania, United States. It is a six-story brick structure constructed in 1907. The hotel structure is now used as a mixed-use building.

It was listed on the National Register of Historic Places in 1984.

== See also ==
- National Register of Historic Places listings in McKean County, Pennsylvania
