= Jack F. Shaw =

Jack F. Shaw

John F. "Jack" Shaw (June 1, 1938 – January 9, 2009) was a Western Michigan University track and cross-country coach whose tenure spanned 32 years. Shaw took over the head coaching reins from George Dales in 1970; he retired from the position in June 2002. Shaw was born in Kane, Pennsylvania; he died at the age of 70, in Kalamazoo, Michigan, on January 9, 2009.

== Mentor to 56 All-Americans at WMU ==
As Men's Head Coach at Western Michigan University, Shaw was named Mid-American Conference Coach of the Year in outdoor track six times; five times in cross country and once for indoor track. A four-time recipient of the Central Collegiate Conference Coach of the Year award, in 1995; he was also named National Collegiate Athletic Association District IV Coach of the Year. Shaw was enshrined within the university's Athletic Hall of Fame in 1997, after leading the WMU Bronco men's track and field team to six Mid-American Conference outdoor championships - including back-to-back titles in 1995 and 1996. WMU also finished as the MAC runner-up nine times with Shaw at the helm.

During Shaw's tenure, the university's indoor track and field team finished in the top-three (at the MAC Invitational) on six occasions. Western Michigan University also claimed five MAC cross-country titles during Shaw's career; including consecutive championships in 1976 and 1977. With Shaw's guidance, the Broncos won two Central Collegiate Conference outdoor track titles, in 1995 and 1996; one indoor CCC title in 1993, and three CCC cross country crowns in 1970, 1996 and 1999. Nationally, Jack Shaw's squads placed fifth in 1970 and 12th in 1989 at the NCAA Division I Cross Country Championships.

Shaw produced more NCAA All-Americans than any other coach in Western Michigan University history, with a total of fifty-six. Twenty-nine of Shaw's outdoor track and field athletes earned All-America Team recognition; as did twenty-one indoor track athletes and six cross country runners.

== Early career and education ==
Prior to arriving at Western Michigan, Shaw had served as an assistant coach for the University of Pittsburgh, for Marshall University, and Ohio University; Jack had arrived on the collegiate scene after guiding Warren High School of Pennsylvania to a state cross-country championship in 1966.

Jack Shaw earned his master's degree from Western Michigan University, and his bachelor's degree (in Geology) from Muskingum College of Ohio. As an undergraduate, Shaw was captain of the Muskingum track and field team; in 1960, Jack established a varsity record in the 120-yard hurdles. Shaw also served in the United States Army from 1962 until 1968; it was during his military service that Jack developed and nurtured a desire to coach.

The 1971 marriage of Jack and Karen Olson-Shaw brought two sons, Scott and Timothy. Shaw's legacy is also carried on by WMU; the annual home outdoor track meet — The Jack Shaw Classic — takes place every spring at Western's Kanley Track Stadium.

== Shaw's NCAA All-Americans ==
Outdoor Track and Field

- 2002 Dale Cowper, 13th, hammer throw, 208-0
- 1998 Phil McMullen, 5th, decathlon, 7,613
- 1997 Phil McMullen, 2nd, decathlon, 7,731
- 1996 Burger Lambrechts, 8th, shot put, 61–0.5
- 1995 Jeff Brandenburg, 8th, shot put, 59–11.75
- 1995 Brian Keane, 11th, javelin, 221-6
- 1993 Brian Keane, 4th, javelin, 235-1
- 1993 Nate Langlois, 10th, 200 meters, 20.79
- 1992 Vinton Bennett, 3rd, high jump, 7–4.25
- 1992 Brian Keane, 7th, javelin, 224-4
- 1991 Vinton Bennett, 3rd, high jump, 7–5.25
- 1990 Jesse McGuire, 7th, 10,000 meters, 29:05.09
- 1985 Alex Washington, 6th, 110 meter Hurdles, 13.74 (w)
- 1983 Alex Washington, 10th, 110 meter Hurdles, 13.7 (ht), 14.01*
- 1982 Jack Mclntosh, 2nd, 800 meters, 1:48.1
- 1981 Chuck Greene, 8th, javelin, 249-1
- 1980 Jack Mclntosh, 7th, 800 meters, 1:49.86
- 1979 Jack Mclntosh, 2nd, 800 meters, 1:46.76
- 1978 Ron Parisi, 6th, javelin, 248-4
- 1977 Tom Duits, 5th, 1500 meters, 3:41.3
- 1971 Jeromee Liebenberg, 3rd, 3000 meter steeplechase, 8:37.0
- 1971 John Bennett, 6th, six-mile, 27:54.3

Indoor Track and Field

- 2001 Dale Cowper, 12th, weight throw, 66–11.5
- 1996 Burger Lambrechts, 3rd, shot put, 61–9.5
- 1995 Jeff Brandenburg, 7th, shot put, 58–9.75
- 1994 Jeff Brandenburg, 7th, shot put, 60-4
- 1993 Nate Langlois, 7th, 200 meters, 21.38
- 1988 Robert Louis, 5th, 200 meters, 21.34
- 1988 Jamie Hence, 5th, 55 meter Hurdles, 7.38
- 1985 Tom Broekema, Robert Louis, Brad Mora, Eric Teutsch - 5th, distance medley relay, 9:42.53
- 1985 Alex Washington, 8th, 55 meter Hurdles, 7.32
- 1982 Mike Fowler, Gordon Mclntosh, Kurt Liechty, Jack Mclntosh - 6th, two-mile relay, 7:30.60
- 1981 Mike Ericksen, 7th, 600 meters, 1:12.11
- 1981 Dave Beauchamp, Gordon Mclntosh, Dana Houston, Kurt Liechty - 3rd, two-mile relay, 7:34.15
- 1979 Dave Beauchamp, Mike Karasiewicz, Mike Thompson, Jack Mclntosh - 2nd, two-mile relay, 7:31.9
- 1978 Tom Duits, 5th, mile, 4:13.45
- 1976 Mike Schomer, 2nd, weight throw, 62–5.75
- 1972 Gary Harris, 2nd, two-mile, 8:37.4

Cross-Country

- 1989 Jesse McGuire, 14th, 30:09.34
- 1989 Brad Kirk, 33rd, 30:36
- 1988 Jesse McGuire, 26th, 30:01
- 1976 Tom Duits, 35th, 29:32.98
- 1970 Jeromee Liebenberg, 14th, 28:46
- 1970 Gary Harris, 18th, 28:50
