= Big 30 All-Star Football Game =

The Big 30 All-Star Football Game is a high school football all-star game held in the Twin Tiers region of Western New York and northern Pennsylvania. The game is held annually each August at Parkway Field on the campus of Bradford Area High School in Bradford, Pennsylvania and is broadcast live on radio station WESB.

Each team consists of 43 players from a 15 school-district area in each state (15+15 being the "30" indicated in the game's title). New York's team covers mostly Cattaraugus County, portions of Allegany County, and two small districts in southeastern Chautauqua County, while Pennsylvania's team covers a five-county area including Warren, McKean, Cameron, Potter and Elk Counties. This area roughly, though not exactly, corresponds to the coverage area of the Olean Times Herald, the major newspaper serving the region. The players are mostly high school graduates; some go on to play college football but many do not. Unlike most high school football games in New York and Pennsylvania, most games have full fifteen-minute quarters; the standard for most high school games is twelve minutes.

Through 2015, there have been 42 contests. New York leads the series 22-18-2. The Empire State defeated the Keystone State by a 46–37 score in the 2010 game, but most recent matches had mostly been won by Pennsylvania, including a 27–0 shutout in 2008, a 13–6 win by the Keystone State in 2009, where Pennsylvania held New York to zero completed passes, and a 28–3 win in 2011 built primarily on two New York fumbles. The 2012 game was won by New York. New York won the 2015 contest by a margin of 44–8, a record for the event.

The Big 30 Charities Classic expanded to men's and women's basketball contests in 2015, with the inaugural contests held on March 15, 2015. WGWE broadcast the games, which were held at the high school in Portville, New York.

From approximately 2003 to 2015, the football game was named the Don Raabe Big 30 Charities Classic after Don Raabe, one of the founders of the game. Disputes with Raabe's estate, trademark concerns and a decline in funds prompted the game organizers to remove his name from the game's title.

The 2020 Edition of the game was cancelled due to the COVID-19 pandemic.
