= Kane Armory =

- U.S. National Register of Historic Places
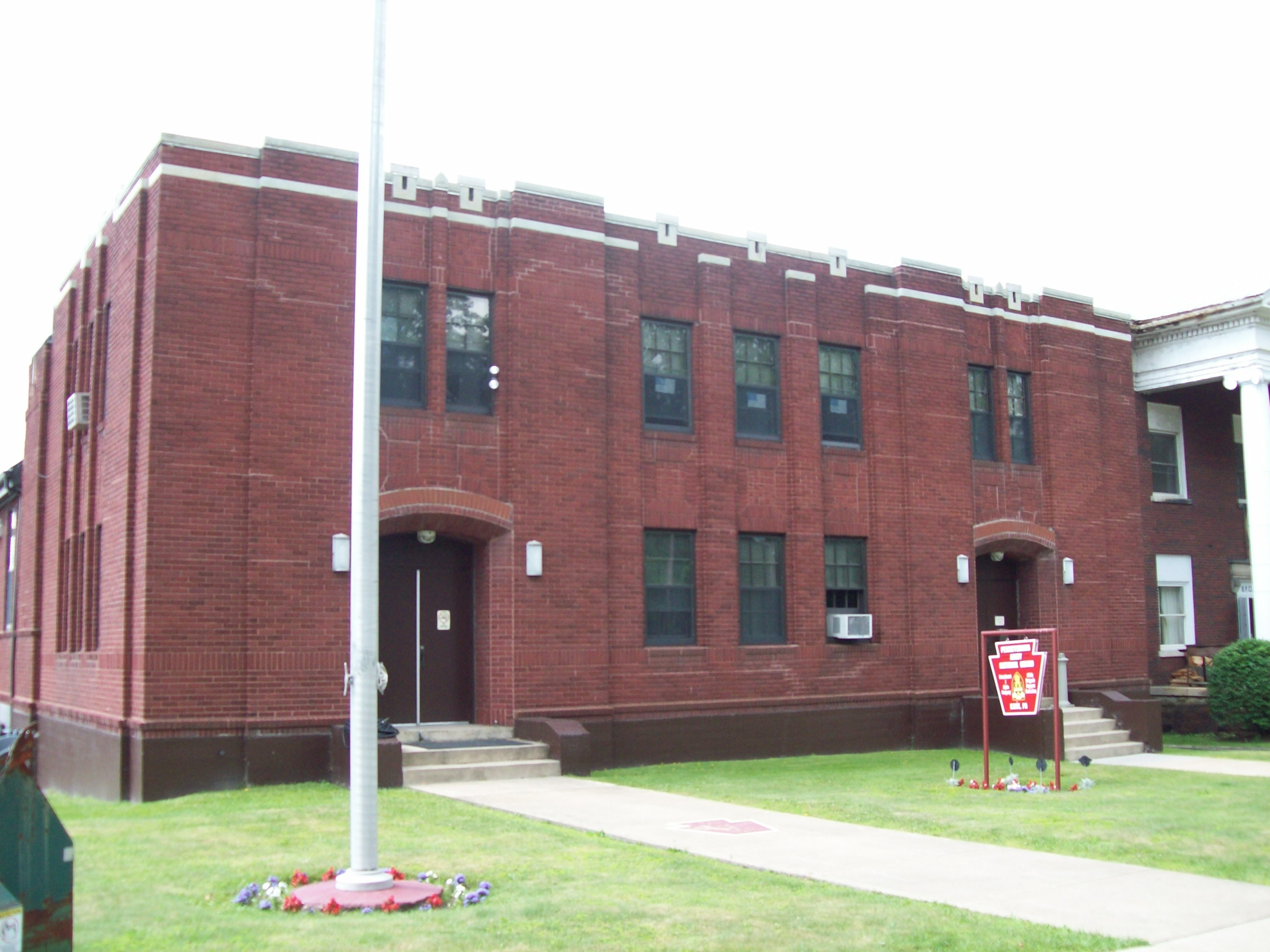
- Kane Armory, June 2009

- Location within Pennsylvania
- Location: Chestnut and Fraley Streets, Kane, Pennsylvania
- Coordinates: 41°39′28.5″N 78°48′38″W
- Built: 1922; 104 years ago
- Architect: Joseph P. Kuntz, W.G. Wilkins Company
- Architectural style: Art Deco
- MPS: Pennsylvania National Guard Armories MPS
- NRHP reference No.: 91000512
- Added to NRHP: May 9, 1991; 35 years ago

Kane Armory is a historic National Guard "T" Plan armory located in Kane, McKean County, Pennsylvania, United States. It was designed by Joseph F. Kuntz of Pittsburgh firm W.G. Wilkins Company. The original two-story drill hall was built in 1922, for the 112th Infantry of the Pennsylvania National Guard. A two-story administrative section was subsequent added in 1929.

It was listed on the National Register of Historic Places on May 9, 1991.

== See also ==
- National Register of Historic Places listings in McKean County, Pennsylvania
