= Kane, Pennsylvania =

Borough in Pennsylvania, US

- Borough
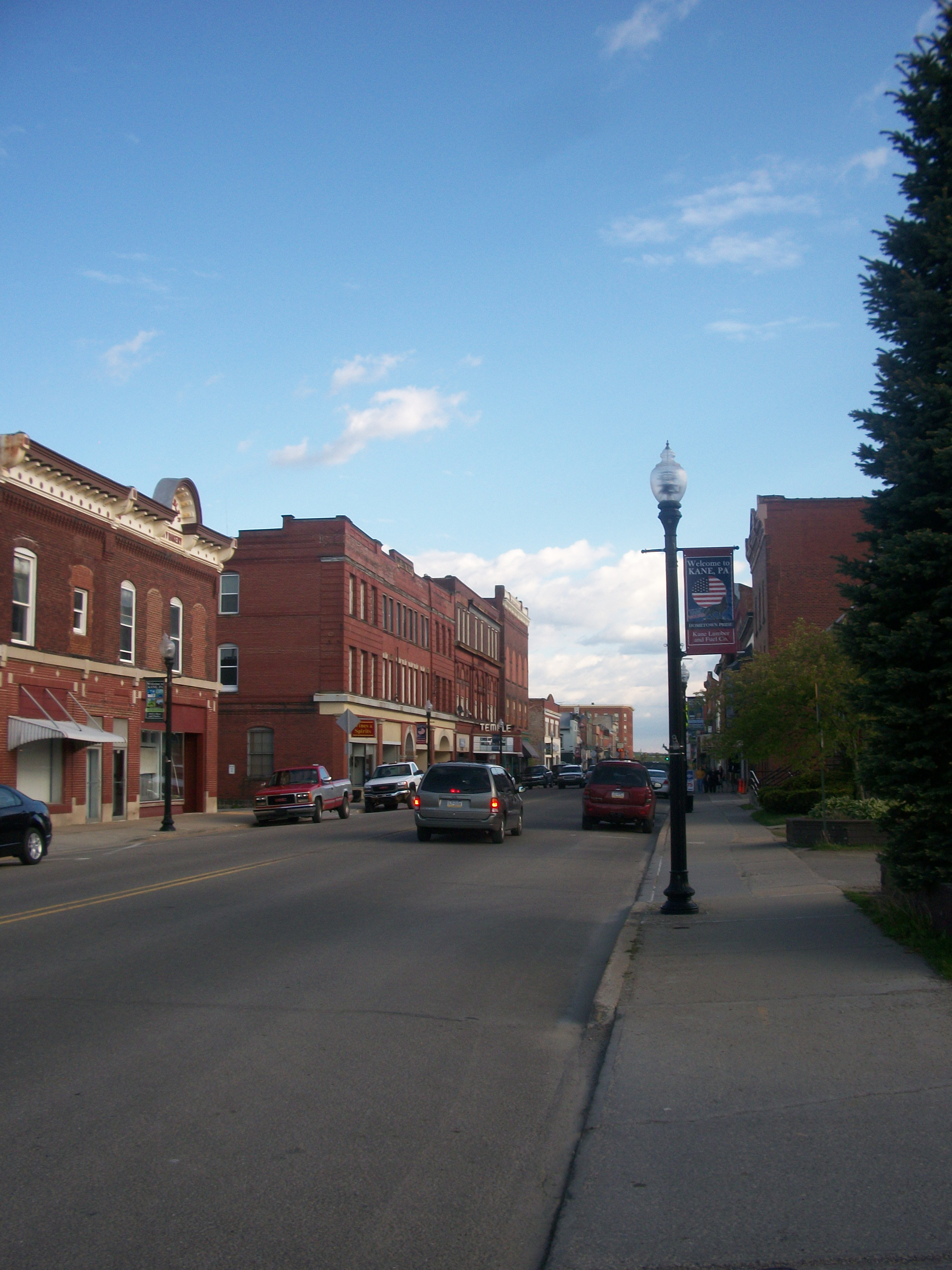
- Downtown Kane in October 2011

- Location in McKean County, Pennsylvania

- Location within Pennsylvania Location within the United States
- Coordinates: 41°39′42″N 78°48′37″W
- Country: United States
- State: Pennsylvania
- County: McKean
- Settled: 1864
- Incorporated: 1887

Government
  - Mayor: Brandy Schimp (R)

Area
  - Total: 1.57 sq mi (4.06 km^{2})
  - Land: 1.56 sq mi (4.05 km^{2})
  - Water: 0 sq mi (0.00 km^{2})
- Elevation: 2,211 ft (674 m)

Population (2020)
  - Total: 3,630
  - Density: 2,319/sq mi (895.4/km^{2})
- Time zone: UTC-5 (Eastern (EST))
  - Summer (DST): UTC-4 (EDT)
- ZIP Code: 16735
- Area code: 814
- FIPS code: 42-38688
- Website: kanepa.com

Kane is a borough in McKean County in the U.S. state of Pennsylvania, 87 miles (140 km) east-southeast of Erie. It was founded in 1864 by Civil War General Thomas L. Kane of the famous Bucktail Regiment. In the early part of the 20th century, Kane was an industrial hub. The population peaked in the 1920s, but has since declined to 3,630 people as of the 2020 census.

== History ==
=== 19th century ===
Kane was founded by Brigadier General Thomas L. Kane and his wife Elizabeth Denniston Wood Kane, M.D. Thomas L. Kane was the second son of Judge John Kintzing Kane of Philadelphia, a prominent associate of Presidents Jackson and Polk. Elizabeth Kane and three of their four children became physicians in Kane.

The Kane mansion, also called Anoatok, Kane Armory, Thomas L. Kane Memorial Chapel, and the New Thomson House are listed on the National Register of Historic Places. The Kane mansion, known as the Kane Manor, is now a bed and breakfast inn. Reliquarian House, which exists in the Silverside Estate, was built by General Thomas Kane's son, Elisha, as a 90% replica of the original family home, which burned down not long after Thomas's death.

=== 20th century ===
In the early part of the 20th century, Kane had large glass works, bottle works, lumber mills, and manufactures of brush handles, saws, cutlery, screen doors and windows.

Kane was a popular summer vacation destination in the 1950s and 60s.

==== Kane Tornado of 1985 ====
On May 31, 1985, a tornado destroyed many homes in Kane and neighboring East Kane. The F4 tornado passed through town at approximately 8:15 PM and resulted in 3 deaths. This was the worst natural disaster in Kane's history.

== Geography ==
Kane is located in southwestern McKean County at an elevation of over 2,000 feet (610 m). U.S. Route 6 passes through the borough as Biddle Street and North Fraley Street; it leads northeast 11 miles (18 km) to Mount Jewett and northwest 27 miles (43 km) to Warren. The city of Erie is 87 miles (140 km) to the northwest via US-6. Pennsylvania Route 66 has its northern terminus in Kane and leads southwest 50 miles (80 km) to Clarion. Pennsylvania Route 321 passes through the eastern part of the borough as Hacker Street and Brick Yard Road; it leads southeast 8 miles (13 km) to Wilcox and northwest 9 miles (14 km) to the Kinzua Creek arm of the Allegheny Reservoir.

According to the U.S. Census Bureau, the borough has a total area of 1.6 square miles (4.1 km^{2}), of which 0.001 square miles (0.003 km^{2}), or 0.06%, are water. Kane sits on a plateau which drains north to Hubert Run, a tributary of Kinzua Creek; southeast to Wilson Run, a tributary of the West Branch of the Clarion River; and southwest to the East Branch of Tionesta Creek. Kinzua Creek, the Clarion River, and Tionesta Creek are all tributaries of the Allegheny River.

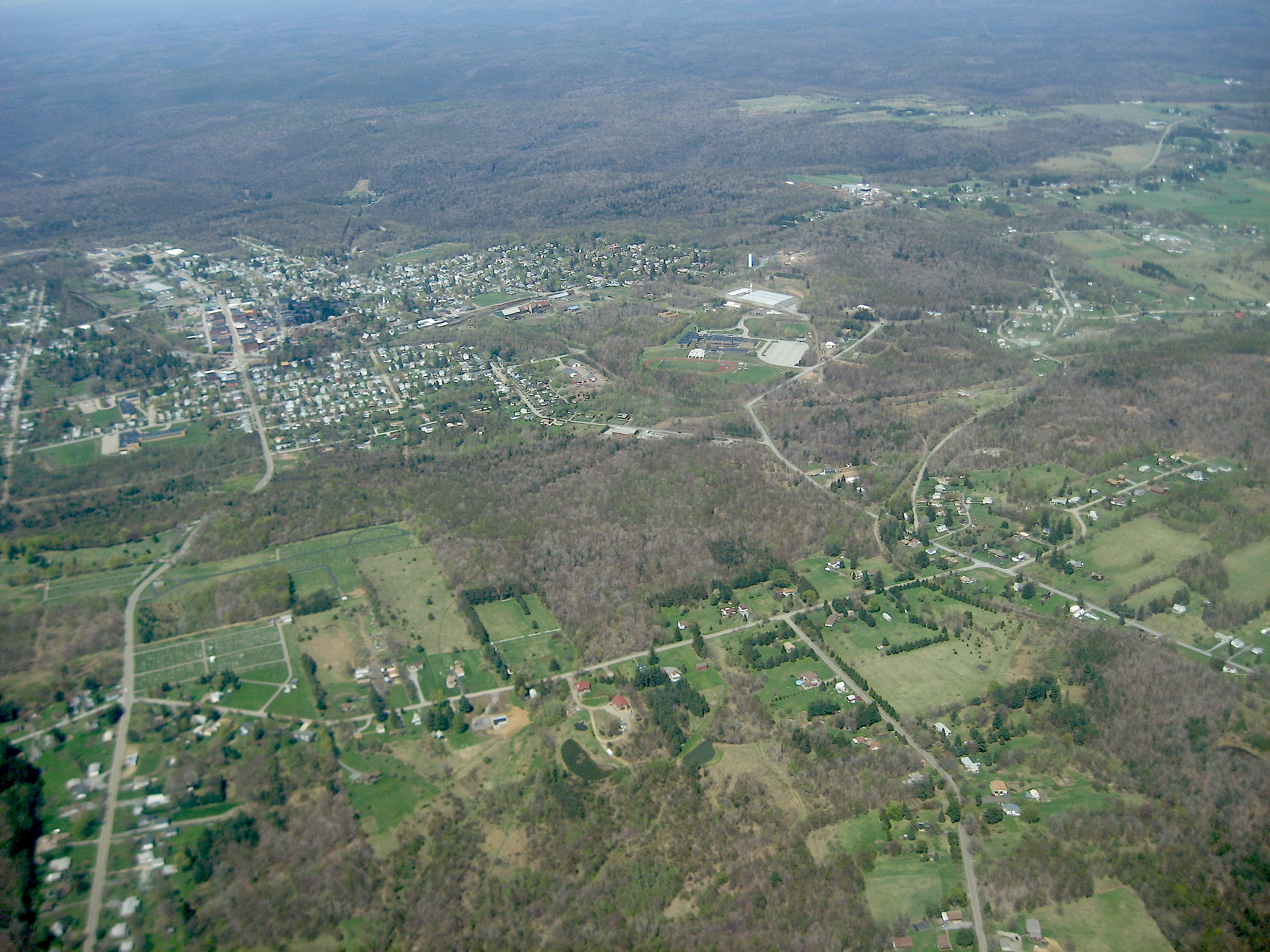
Aerial looking north
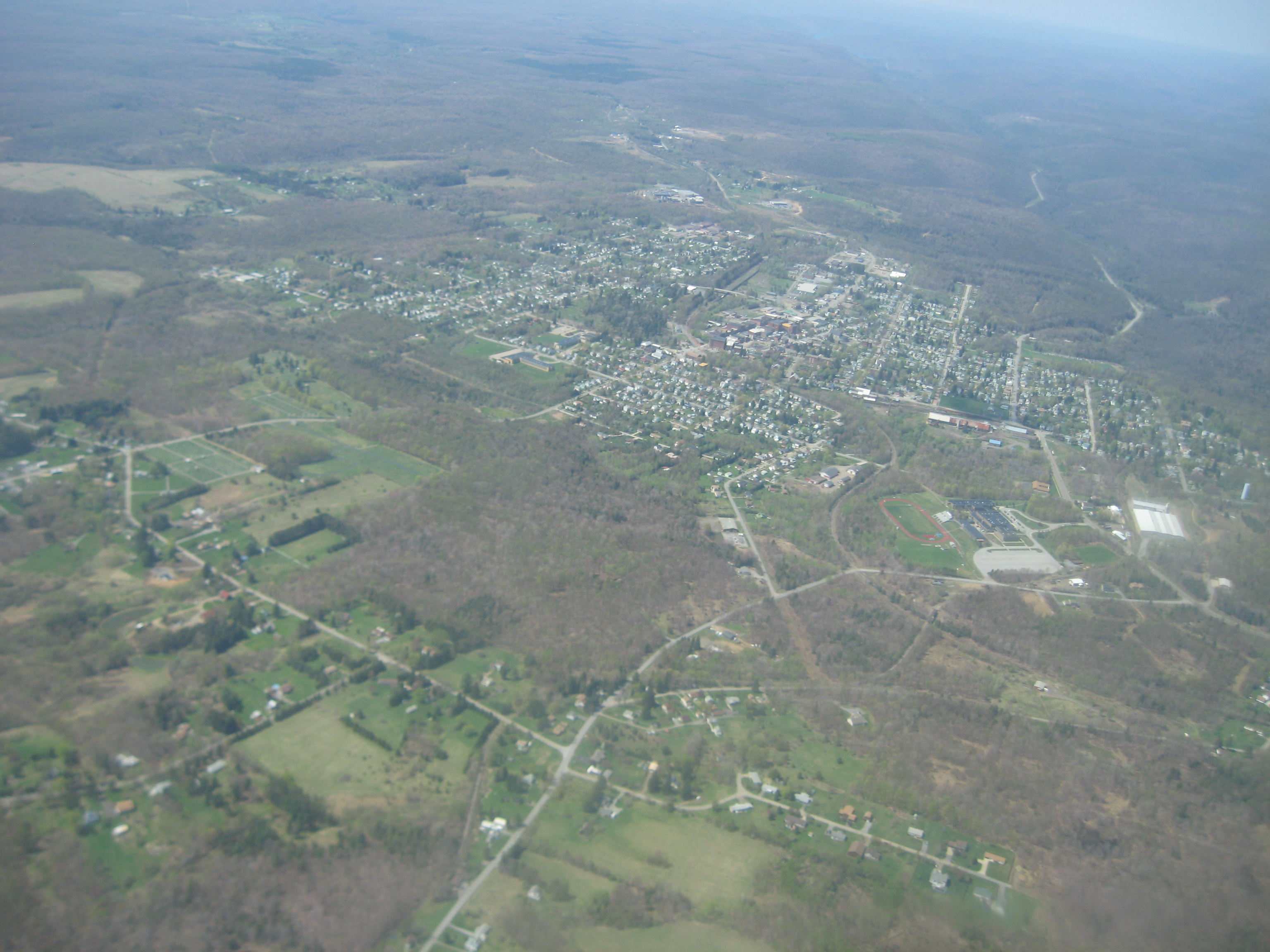
Aerial looking northwest

== Climate ==
Kane has a humid continental climate (Köppen Climate Dfb) with long, snowy winters and warm, humid summers. The record low in Kane is −35 °F (−37 °C) and the record high is 98 °F (37 °C) Late fall/early winter is especially snowy due to heavy amounts of lake effect snow from Lake Erie and, to a lesser extent, Lake Ontario. Lake effect snow during cold snaps in early spring also helps to raise snowfall totals.

Kane is the coldest city in Pennsylvania by annual mean.

Climate data for Kane, Pennsylvania (1991–2020 normals, extremes 1940–present)
| Month | Jan | Feb | Mar | Apr | May | Jun | Jul | Aug | Sep | Oct | Nov | Dec | Year |
|---|---|---|---|---|---|---|---|---|---|---|---|---|---|
| Record high °F (°C) | 68 (20) | 71 (22) | 81 (27) | 87 (31) | 95 (35) | 98 (37) | 98 (37) | 93 (34) | 92 (33) | 85 (29) | 77 (25) | 70 (21) | 98 (37) |
| Mean daily maximum °F (°C) | 30.4 (−0.9) | 33.2 (0.7) | 42.3 (5.7) | 55.9 (13.3) | 67.4 (19.7) | 75.1 (23.9) | 78.7 (25.9) | 77.5 (25.3) | 70.8 (21.6) | 58.6 (14.8) | 45.6 (7.6) | 34.9 (1.6) | 55.9 (13.3) |
| Daily mean °F (°C) | 21.8 (−5.7) | 23.0 (−5.0) | 31.2 (−0.4) | 43.1 (6.2) | 53.8 (12.1) | 62.2 (16.8) | 65.9 (18.8) | 64.6 (18.1) | 58.0 (14.4) | 47.0 (8.3) | 36.6 (2.6) | 27.4 (−2.6) | 44.6 (7.0) |
| Mean daily minimum °F (°C) | 13.2 (−10.4) | 12.9 (−10.6) | 20.2 (−6.6) | 30.3 (−0.9) | 40.2 (4.6) | 49.4 (9.7) | 53.2 (11.8) | 51.7 (10.9) | 45.2 (7.3) | 35.4 (1.9) | 27.5 (−2.5) | 20.0 (−6.7) | 33.3 (0.7) |
| Record low °F (°C) | −35 (−37) | −32 (−36) | −24 (−31) | 0 (−18) | 14 (−10) | 24 (−4) | 30 (−1) | 25 (−4) | 17 (−8) | 10 (−12) | −6 (−21) | −26 (−32) | −35 (−37) |
| Average precipitation inches (mm) | 3.82 (97) | 2.83 (72) | 3.56 (90) | 4.24 (108) | 4.51 (115) | 4.73 (120) | 4.62 (117) | 4.43 (113) | 3.91 (99) | 4.03 (102) | 3.84 (98) | 3.99 (101) | 48.51 (1,232) |
| Average snowfall inches (cm) | 25.4 (65) | 20.4 (52) | 13.4 (34) | 2.9 (7.4) | 0.1 (0.25) | 0.0 (0.0) | 0.0 (0.0) | 0.0 (0.0) | 0.0 (0.0) | 0.8 (2.0) | 8.2 (21) | 21.7 (55) | 92.9 (236) |
| Average precipitation days (≥ 0.01 in) | 19.6 | 15.8 | 15.0 | 14.7 | 14.1 | 13.8 | 12.2 | 11.7 | 11.9 | 14.6 | 15.1 | 18.5 | 177.0 |
| Average snowy days (≥ 0.1 in) | 14.5 | 11.7 | 7.2 | 2.3 | 0.1 | 0.0 | 0.0 | 0.0 | 0.0 | 0.6 | 5.1 | 11.2 | 52.7 |
Source: NOAA

== Demographics ==
Historical population
| Census | Pop. | Note | %± |
|---|---|---|---|
| 1890 | 2,944 | | — |
| 1900 | 5,296 | | 79.9% |
| 1910 | 6,626 | | 25.1% |
| 1920 | 7,283 | | 9.9% |
| 1930 | 6,232 | | −14.4% |
| 1940 | 6,133 | | −1.6% |
| 1950 | 5,706 | | −7.0% |
| 1960 | 5,380 | | −5.7% |
| 1970 | 5,001 | | −7.0% |
| 1980 | 4,916 | | −1.7% |
| 1990 | 4,590 | | −6.6% |
| 2000 | 4,126 | | −10.1% |
| 2010 | 3,730 | | −9.6% |
| 2020 | 3,630 | | −2.7% |

=== 2020 census ===
As of the 2020 census, Kane had a population of 3,630. The median age was 42.8 years. 22.9% of residents were under the age of 18 and 22.1% of residents were 65 years of age or older. For every 100 females there were 98.0 males, and for every 100 females age 18 and over there were 92.1 males age 18 and over.

0.0% of residents lived in urban areas, while 100.0% lived in rural areas.

There were 1,572 households in Kane, of which 25.4% had children under the age of 18 living in them. Of all households, 37.8% were married-couple households, 22.5% were households with a male householder and no spouse or partner present, and 30.4% were households with a female householder and no spouse or partner present. About 39.1% of all households were made up of individuals and 18.6% had someone living alone who was 65 years of age or older.

There were 1,765 housing units, of which 10.9% were vacant. The homeowner vacancy rate was 3.7% and the rental vacancy rate was 6.6%.

Racial composition as of the 2020 census
| Race | Number | Percent |
|---|---|---|
| White | 3,393 | 93.5% |
| Black or African American | 21 | 0.6% |
| American Indian and Alaska Native | 0 | 0.0% |
| Asian | 17 | 0.5% |
| Native Hawaiian and Other Pacific Islander | 0 | 0.0% |
| Some other race | 16 | 0.4% |
| Two or more races | 183 | 5.0% |
| Hispanic or Latino (of any race) | 58 | 1.6% |

=== 2010 census ===
As of the census of 2010, there were 3,730 people, 1,758 households, and 1,052 families residing in the borough. The population density was 2,331.25 people per square mile. There were 1,993 housing units at an average density of 1,179.0 per square mile. The racial makeup of the borough was 98.91% White, 0.12% African American, 0.10% Native American, 0.17% Asian, 0.24% from other races, and 0.46% from two or more races. Hispanic or Latino of any race were 0.82% of the population.

There were 1,758 households, out of which 28.4% had children under the age of 18 living with them, 46.9% were married couples living together, 11.4% had a female householder with no husband present, and 38.2% were non-families. 34.4% of all households were made up of individuals, and 18.4% had someone living alone who was 65 years of age or older. The average household size was 2.26 and the average family size was 2.91.

In the borough the population was spread out, with 23.1% under the age of 18, 7.6% from 18 to 24, 26.6% from 25 to 44, 21.9% from 45 to 64, and 20.8% who were 65 years of age or older. The median age was 40 years. For every 100 females there were 86.4 males. For every 100 females age 18 and over, there were 82.5 males.

The median income for a household in the borough was $30,460, and the median income for a family was $38,672. Males had a median income of $32,318 versus $20,907 for females. The per capita income for the borough was $16,167. About 11.1% of families and 13.1% of the population were below the poverty line, including 19.7% of those under age 18 and 12.2% of those age 65 or over.

== Recreation ==
Kane's proximity to Allegheny National Forest provides access to activities including hiking, fishing, and boating. Other local parks include Kinzua Bridge State Park and Evergreen Park.

Kane is home to the Kane Family Drive-In Theatre.

For 20 years, Kane has hosted Art in the Wilds, a fine arts show held in Evergreen Park during the fourth weekend of June.

== Media ==
- The Kane Republican — One of two daily newspapers containing both local and national news in McKean County (the other being the Bradford Era). The Republican is an afternoon newspaper, published by the same company as Elk County's newspapers, the St. Marys Daily Press and the Ridgway Record.
- WXZY-LP (FM 101.7) — Established in 2014 as a non-profit community station, 101. 7 WXZY broadcasts a wide variety of musical genres as well as coverage of local events, news, and sports.
- WPSX (FM 90.1) — A repeater of WPSU-FM, the Penn State University-owned NPR affiliate, is licensed to Kane.
- WBYB (FM 103.9) — No longer located in Kane, WBYB was the final incarnation of the station serving Kane at 103.9, (formerly known as WLMI). A longtime country music outlet throughout the 1980s, 1990s and 2000s, as of July 2013, the base of operations and transmitter has been relocated to Eldred, on the other side of the county.
- WQLE (AM 960, defunct) — McKean County's very first local radio station, first signing on the air as WADP in 1954. The call letters were changed to WKZA in the 1970s and to its last call sign, WQLE, circa 1990. The station fell silent in late 1992 and has not returned to the air since. Its tower and studio building, located south of Kane, were dismantled in the late 1990s.
- WCGN (FM 88.3) — The "Family Life Network" has a radio translator in Kane.

Radio stations based in and around Warren and Saint Marys are also audible in the Kane area.

No television stations currently serve the Kane region, with the only television service coming from cable and satellite providers. For the purpose of designated market areas, Kane is at the southwestern corner of the Buffalo television market, but is geographically closer to the Central Pennsylvania market. Both markets' stations (as well as, occasionally, those of the Erie market, whose DMA ends in neighboring Warren County) are seen on local cable and satellite providers.

== Industry ==
The Holgate Toy Company was for many years based in Kane. One of the more famous toys they manufactured was a wooden replica of the Mister Rogers Trolley car, seen in every single episode of Mister Rogers' Neighborhood. The company has since relocated to Bradford.

== Education ==
The Kane Area School District, which covers the municipality, has two schools that house the district's 1,220 students (as of the 2013–14 school year). Kane Area High School, which opened in 1972, is located just outside Kane in Wetmore Township. The high school sits on the former site of General Thomas Kane's homestead, which burned to the ground in 1896. The high school auditorium stage is roughly where Gen. Kane's front porch would have sat, looking out over the valley where the present-day football field and track sit. The high school houses grades nine through twelve.

The Kane Area Elementary-Middle School is located on West Hemlock Avenue and opened in 2010. The existing middle school was renovated in a multimillion-dollar project by the district, and a new elementary wing was added on the east side of the former junior high. The elementary-middle school houses students from kindergarten through eighth grade.

The construction of the new addition at the middle school was in response to KASD's board of directors voting to close the Mount Jewett Elementary School and the Chestnut Street Elementary School. Mount Jewett closed after the 2006–07 school year, while Chestnut Street closed after the 2009–10 school year. The Mount Jewett school has since been sold to a private businessman. The Chestnut Street Complex is currently owned by Kane Innovations and used as office space for Kane Innovations, the KASD, Head Start, and the Intermediate Unit 9.

== Notable residents ==
- Chuck Daly, two-time NBA Champion and 1992 Olympic gold medalist coach
- Jack Shaw, six-time Mid American Conference Track and Field Coach of the Year for Western Michigan University
- Amy Rudolph, an Olympic distance runner and qualifier in the 1996 and 2000 Summer Games
- Maryanne Amacher, composer
- Evan O'Neill Kane, a surgeon known for removing his own appendix and repairing his own hernia under local anesthetic
