= Bradford Armory =

- U.S. National Register of Historic Places
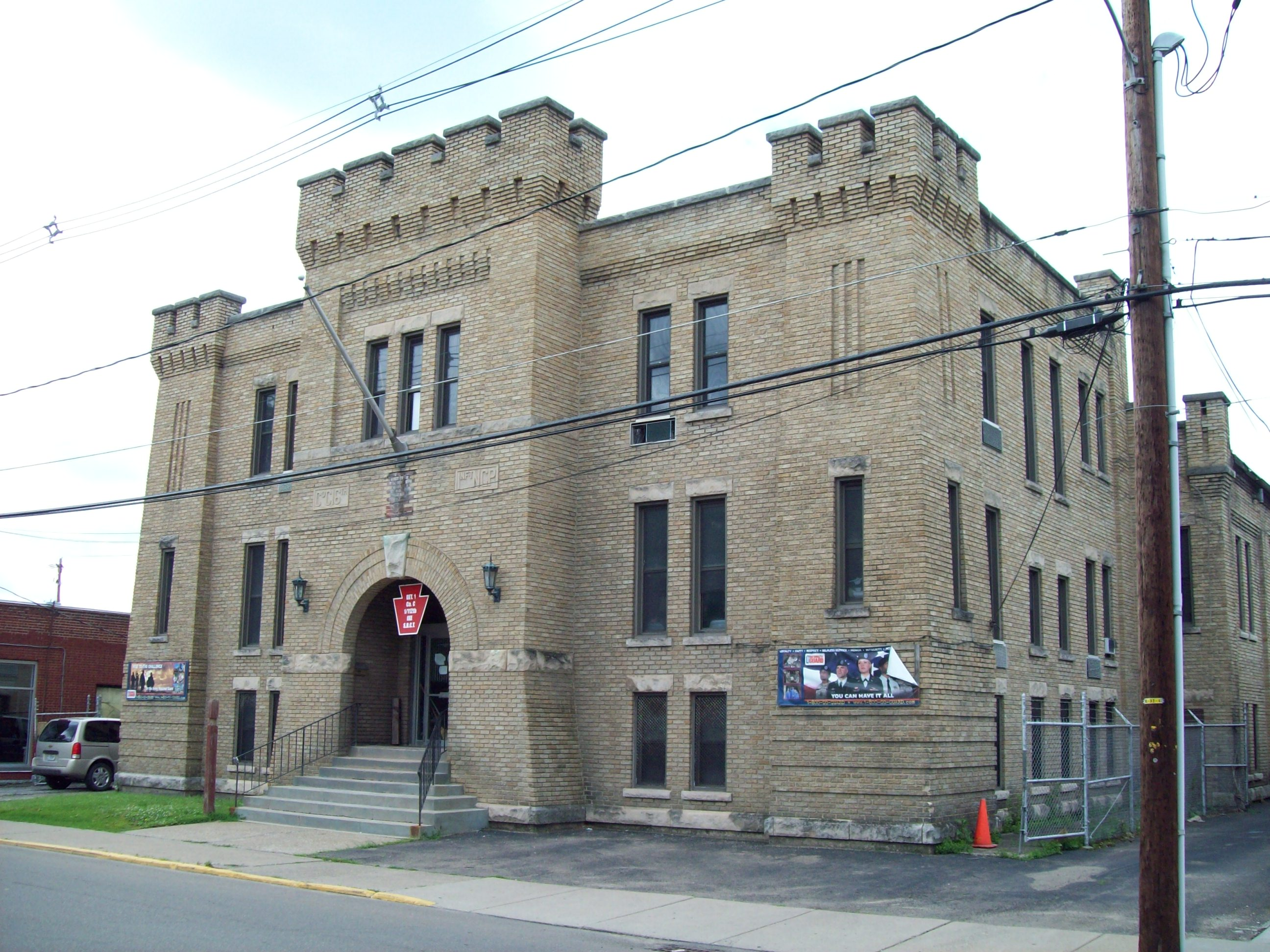
- Bradford Armory, June 2009

- Location within Pennsylvania Location within the United States
- Location: 28 Barbour St., Bradford, Pennsylvania
- Coordinates: 41°57′23″N 78°39′13″W
- Area: 0.3 acres (0.12 ha)
- Built: 1912
- Architect: Mount, A.P.,& Son; Tuna Manufacturing Co.
- Architectural style: Romanesque Revival
- MPS: Pennsylvania National Guard Armories MPS
- NRHP reference No.: 91000508
- Added to NRHP: May 09, 1991

Bradford Armory, is a historic National Guard armory located in Bradford, Pennsylvania, in McKean County. It was listed on the National Register of Historic Places on May 9, 1991.

It was built in 1912 for Company C, 16th Infantry of the Pennsylvania National Guard. It was purchased by John Schenne, a prominent land owner and engineer at the start of the 2014 summer for $60,000. The yellow brick, 60-by-117-foot (18 by 36 m) building was designed in the Romanesque Revival style.

== See also ==
- National Register of Historic Places listings in McKean County, Pennsylvania
