= Thomas L. Kane Memorial Chapel =

Historic church in Pennsylvania, United States

- U.S. National Register of Historic Places
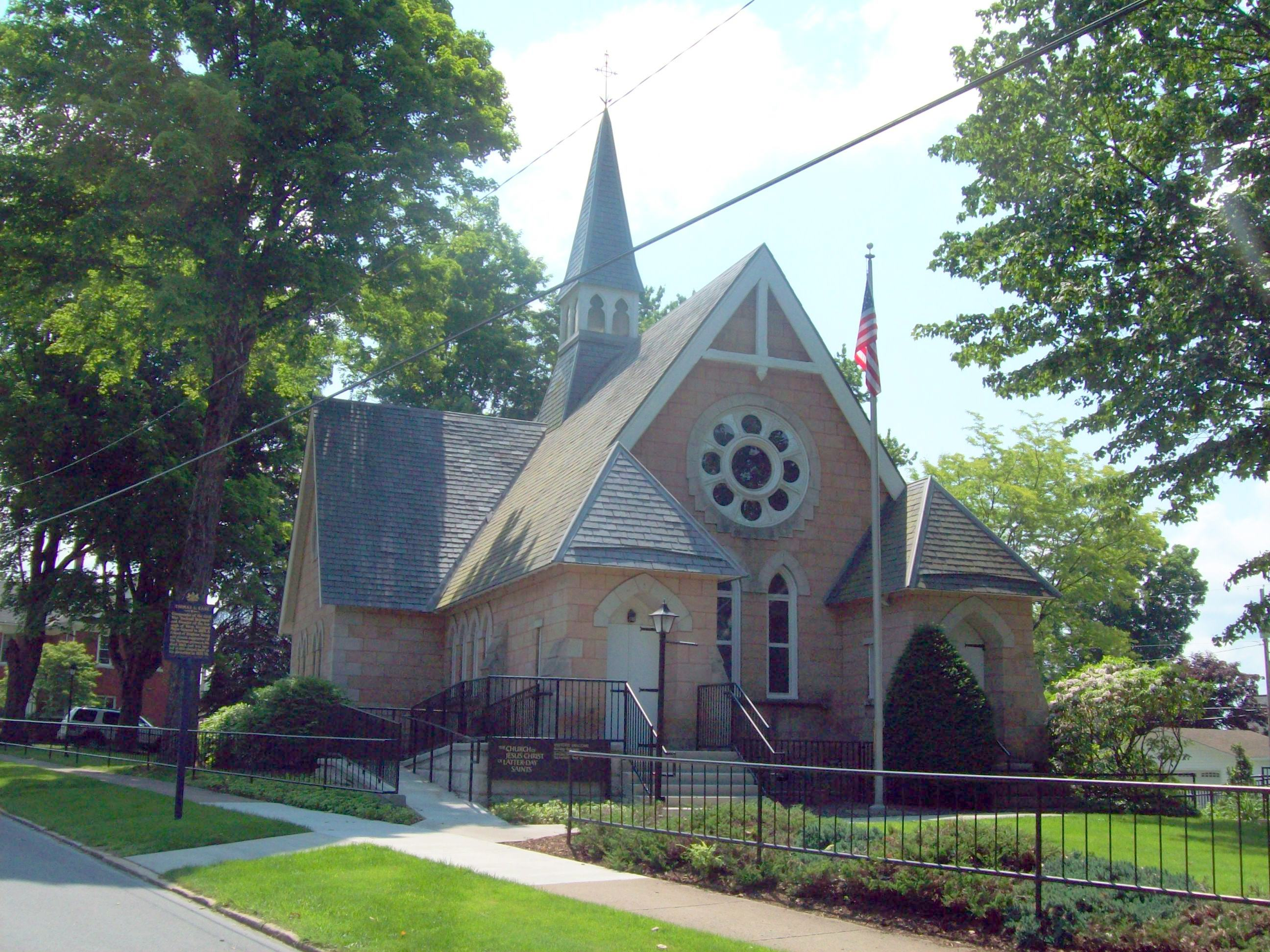
- Thomas L. Kane Memorial Chapel, June 2009

- Location within Pennsylvania
- Location: 30 Chestnut Street; Kane, Pennsylvania
- Coordinates: 41°39′27.5″N 78°48′31.5″W
- Built: 1876–78
- Architect: Henry J. Taylor
- Architectural style: Gothic Revival
- NRHP reference No.: 78003089
- Added to NRHP: March 29, 1978

The Thomas L. Kane Memorial Chapel is a historic church located in Kane, Pennsylvania, in McKean County. The small, stone Gothic Revival chapel was constructed from 1876 to 1878 and was dedicated to the American Civil War General Thomas L. Kane, a founder of Kane. It was listed on the National Register of Historic Places on March 29, 1978.

== History ==
The church was designed by Henry J. Taylor of Philadelphia and was the first Presbyterian church in McKean County. The church was dedicated to General Kane, who had donated the land for the church, and was situated such that the congregation would be facing in the direction of Jerusalem. Kane died in 1883 and, at his request, was interred outside the church, between the two front entrances.

The church was purchased by the Church of Jesus Christ of Latter-day Saints (LDS Church) in 1970, to function as a memorial to Kane, who was a supporter of the Mormons and had acted as a mediator between the Mormons and the federal government. The church also functions as a branch of the Family History Library. A replica of the statue of Kane in the Utah State Capitol was placed outside the church.

On August 1, 2014, the LDS Church donated the church to the Kane Historic Preservation Society, as part of the celebration of the 150th anniversary of the founding of Kane.

== See also ==
- National Register of Historic Places listings in McKean County, Pennsylvania
