= Bradford Old City Hall =

- U.S. National Register of Historic Places
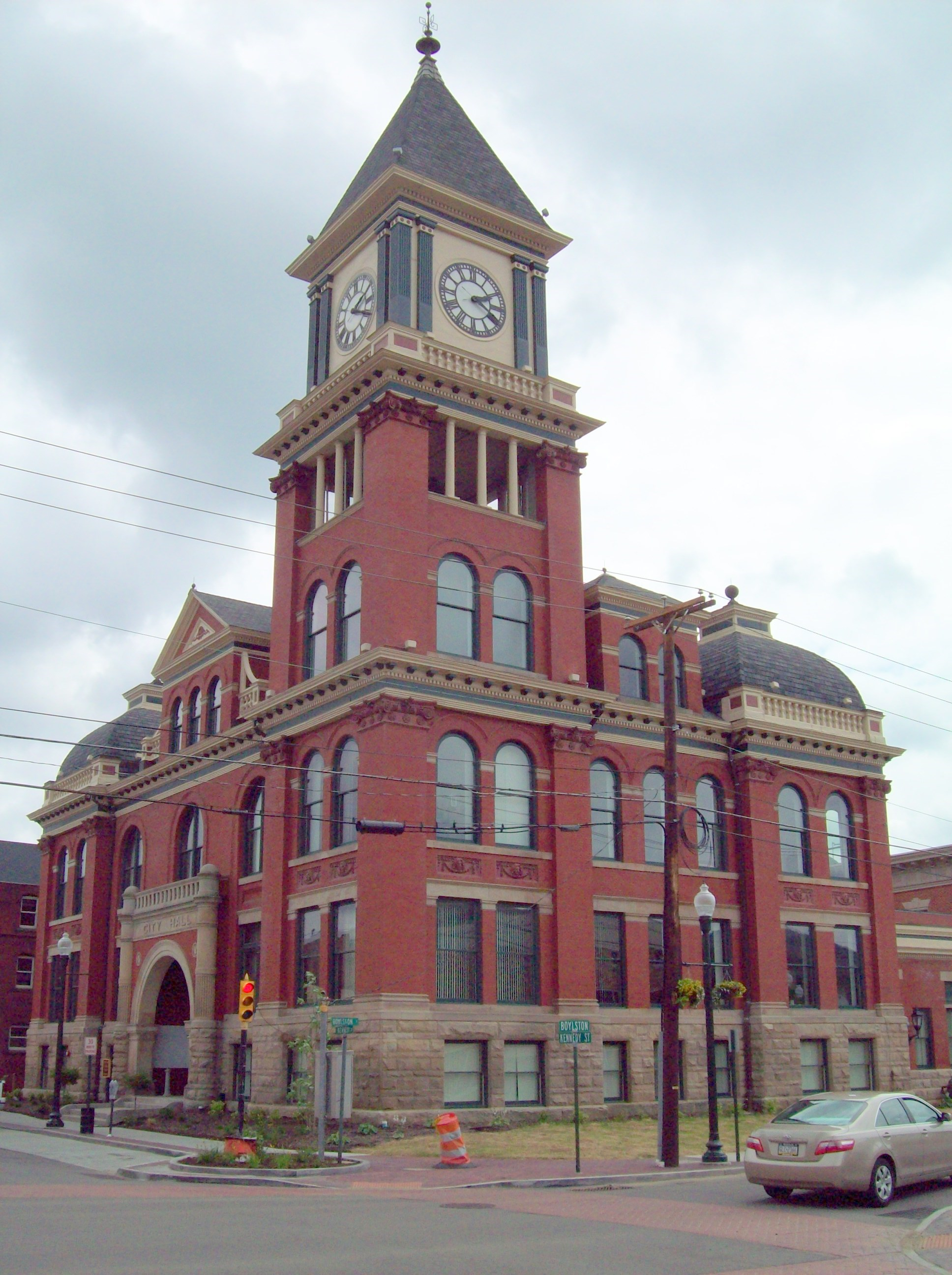
- Bradford Old City Hall, June 2009

- Location within Pennsylvania
- Location: 25–27 Kennedy Street; Bradford, Pennsylvania
- Coordinates: 41°57′25″N 78°38′51.5″W
- Area: ~10,500 square feet (980 m^{2})
- Built: 1897
- Architect: Enoch A. Curtis
- Architectural style: Victorian, Romanesque Revival
- NRHP reference No.: 76002156
- Added to NRHP: May 17, 1976

The Bradford Old City Hall is a historic city hall located in Bradford, Pennsylvania, in McKean County. It was listed on the National Register of Historic Places on May 17, 1976.

The eclectic Victorian Romanesque Revival building was constructed in 1897. The building was designed by architect Enoch A. Curtis of Fredonia, New York. Curtis was also in charge of the building's reconstruction in 1902 after a devastating fire. The 68-by-90-foot (21 by 27 m) brick building features a four-story, 100 feet (30 m) clock tower that houses a four-dialed clock created by Seth Thomas around 1910.

The building no longer functions as city hall, but remains home to some city government offices. The building is also located in a Keystone Opportunity Zone (KOZ).

== See also ==
- National Register of Historic Places listings in McKean County, Pennsylvania
