= Rufus Barrett Stone House =

Historic house in Pennsylvania, United States

- U.S. National Register of Historic Places
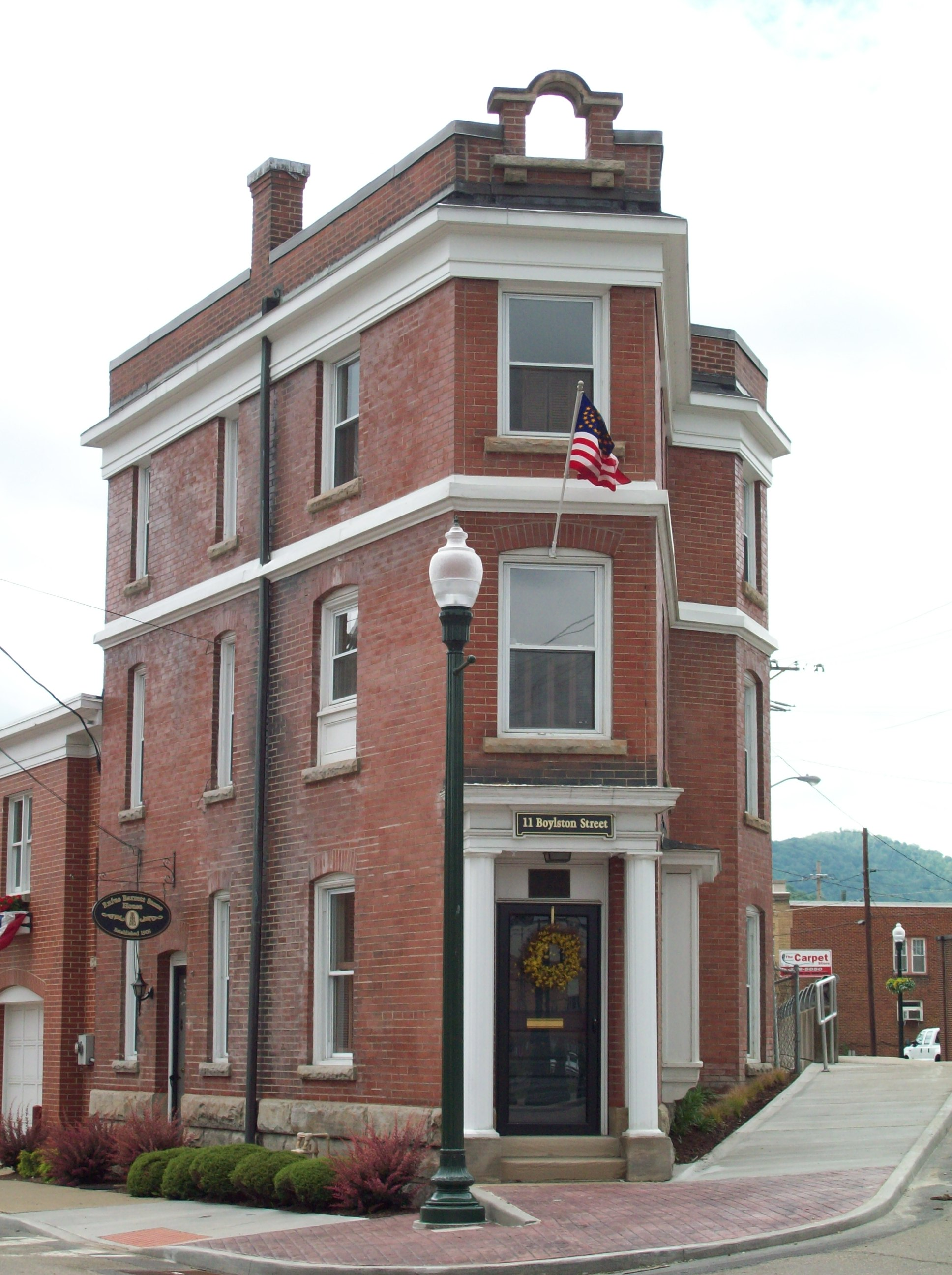
- Rufus Barrett Stone House, June 2009

- Location within Pennsylvania
- Location: 11 Boylston Street, Bradford, Pennsylvania
- Coordinates: 41°57′25.5″N 78°38′59.5″W
- Area: ~900 square feet (84 m^{2})
- Built: 1903
- Architect: Rufus Barrett Stone
- Architectural style: Colonial Revival
- NRHP reference No.: 82001540
- Added to NRHP: November 14, 1982

The Rufus Barrett Stone House, also called the Flatiron Building, is an historic townhouse that is located in Bradford, Pennsylvania, in McKean County.

It was listed on the National Register of Historic Places on November 14, 1982.

== History and architectural features ==
This three-story brick structure was slated to be erected in 1903 on a triangular plot of land between Boylston Street, Pennsylvania Route 346 (East Washington Street) and Tununguant Creek, which prompted the architect to design the building using a distinctive, clothing iron shape. It was built for Rufus Barrett Stone to house his law offices and his residence.

== See also ==
- National Register of Historic Places listings in McKean County, Pennsylvania

== Gallery ==
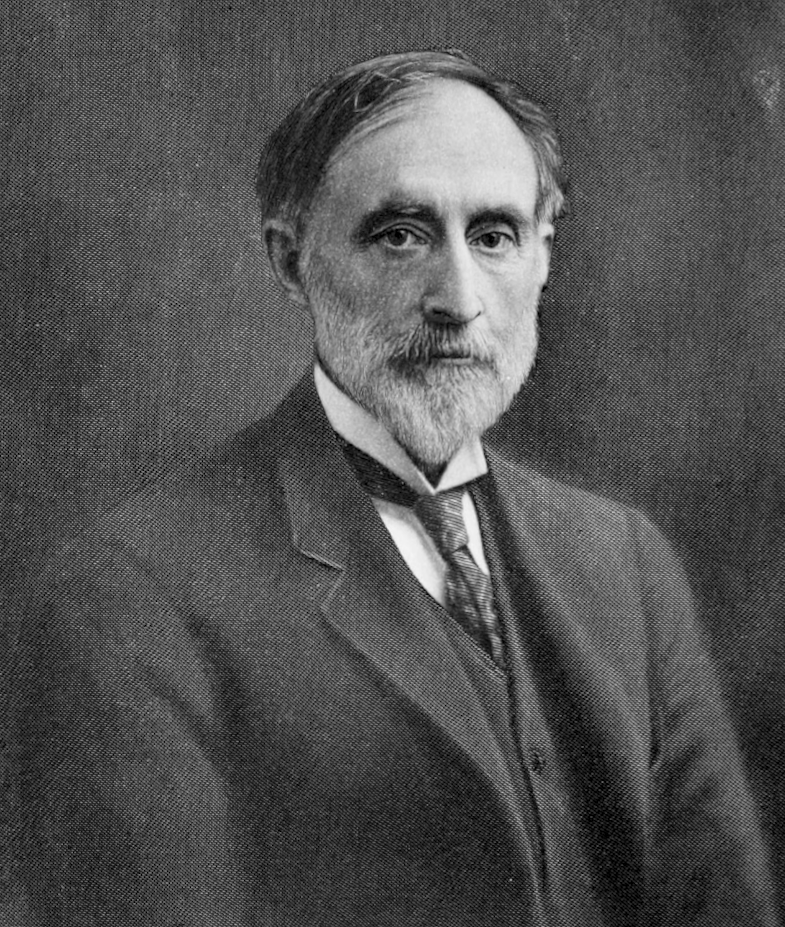
File:Rufus Barrett Stone (1847–1929)
