= Thomas L. Kane =

United States Army general (1822-1883)

Thomas Leiper Kane
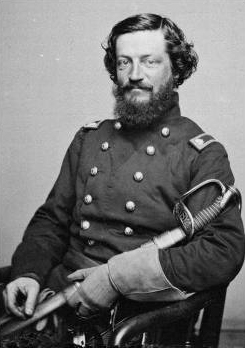
- Kane in 1861 or 1862
- Born: January 27, 1822; Philadelphia, Pennsylvania, U.S.
- Died: December 26, 1883 (aged 61); Philadelphia, Pennsylvania, U.S.
- Burial place: Kane, Pennsylvania, U.S.
- Relatives: Thomas Leiper (grandfather); John K. Kane (father); Elisha Kent Kane (brother); Elizabeth Kane (wife)
- Military career
- Allegiance: United States of America; Union
- Branch: United States Army; Union army
- Service years: 1861–1863
- Rank: Brigadier General; Brevet Major General
- Commands: 1st Pennsylvania Rifle Regiment
- Conflicts: American Civil War
- Awards: Statue in the Utah State Capitol

Thomas Leiper Kane (January 27, 1822 – December 26, 1883) was an American attorney, abolitionist, philanthropist, and military officer who was influential in the western migration of the Latter-day Saint movement and served as a Union Army colonel and general of volunteers in the American Civil War. He received a brevet promotion to major general for gallantry at the Battle of Gettysburg.

After meeting members of the Church of Jesus Christ of Latter-day Saints at an 1846 Philadelphia conference, Kane offered to help in their conflicts with the US government as they tried to migrate West. He negotiated to allow them to occupy land along the Missouri River, and later worked to help Utah achieve statehood. He passed on an offer to govern the territory, giving the position to Brigham Young. During 1857 and 1858, Kane attempted to mediate a dispute between the Latter-day Saints and the US government, persuading Young to concede his governorship to President James Buchanan's appointee, preventing further escalation of the Utah War.

During the American Civil War, Kane organized a Pennsylvania regiment (the "Bucktails"), and served as lieutenant colonel. After his promotion of brigadier general of volunteers, he journeyed by railroad and buggy to convey intelligence about Robert E. Lee's Gettysburg Campaign. Kane and his brigade were victorious at Gettysburg, but Kane had fallen ill and was forced to resign his commission. After the war, Kane and his family settled and helped establish Kane, Pennsylvania. He died of pneumonia in 1883. Both Kane County, Utah, and Kanesville Tabernacle are named for Kane. The Kane Historic Preservation Society maintains the Thomas L. Kane Memorial Chapel in Kane, Pennsylvania, and a statue of Kane stands in the Utah State Capitol, titled "Friend of the Mormons".

== Early life and education ==
Kane was born in Philadelphia, Pennsylvania, on January 27, 1822, to John Kintzing Kane, a US district judge, and Jane Duval Leiper. He was described as being of small stature, or "jockey-like", and food was always marginal. In correspondence, he referred to himself as an invalid. After receiving a stateside education, he traveled to Europe to study in Great Britain and France, and to build up his constitution. In Paris, he befriended French intellectuals such as Auguste Comte. His apartment in France was raided by police who suspected revolutionary activity due to his acceptance of Comte's philosophies. During his several years in Paris, he became proficient in French and contributed articles to several French magazines. He began to study law after returning to the states, and was admitted to the Pennsylvania bar in 1846.

As a young man, he expressed interest in a political career and sought a position in the government of California at the conclusion of the Mexican–American War (1848), but was unsuccessful. He briefly clerked for his father, then obtained a position as a Clerk of the District Court in eastern Pennsylvania. An abolitionist, Kane was distressed at the passage of the Compromise of 1850, which increased his legal responsibility to return fleeing slaves to southern territories under the Fugitive Slave Act. He almost immediately tendered his resignation to his father, who had the younger Kane jailed for contempt of court. The US Supreme Court later overturned this arrest. After his release, Kane became increasingly active in the abolitionist movement. He maintained a correspondence with Horace Greeley and Ralph Waldo Emerson, and wrote newspaper articles on abolition and social issues related to members of the Church of Jesus Christ of Latter-day Saints.

== Mormon philanthropy ==
=== Mormon Battalion ===
Kane came in contact with members of the Church of Jesus Christ of Latter-day Saints during a Philadelphia conference in May 1846. Kane offered them his advice and help in their conflicts with the US government and in their efforts to emigrate to western territories. Jesse C. Little, presiding LDS elder in the East, was soliciting support for the Latter-day Saints' westward migration. Politically well-connected through his father, Kane provided letters of recommendation and later joined Little in Washington, D.C. The two called on the Secretary of State, Secretary of War, and President James K. Polk. As a result of their negotiations, the United States agreed to enlist up to 500 LDS men, in five companies of 75 to 100 men each, as the Mormon Battalion, to serve in the Mexican–American War.

With the help of his father, Kane obtained US government permission for the refugee Mormons to occupy Pottawattamie and Omaha Indian lands along the Missouri River. After carrying dispatches relating to the land agreements and battalion criteria to Fort Leavenworth, Kane sought out Little in the Latter-day Saint encampments on the Missouri River. On July 17, 1846, a meeting was held with Kane, LDS leaders, and Army Captain James Allen to create the Mormon Battalion. Kane met many leaders of the church, and became a popular figure among Mormon emigrants. Miller's Hollow, the principal Iowa settlement of the LDS group at the site of present-day Council Bluffs, was renamed Kanesville in recognition of his service.

During this stay, Kane became seriously ill. Although good care from both an army physician from Fort Leavenworth and church members helped him recover, he suffered poor health the rest of his life.

=== Utah territory and statehood ===
In March 1850, in the midst of debate over establishing Utah Territory, Kane delivered an important lecture before the Philadelphia Historical Society. He described the religion of the Latter-day Saints, their conflicts with other settlers, and the desolation he witnessed during a visit to the recently abandoned Nauvoo, Illinois. He also described the Saints' westward trek. One thousand copies of the lecture, with associated notes and materials, were printed and distributed, primarily to members of Congress and influential men in the Executive Branch. The lecture was reprinted in several Mormon publications: the Frontier Guardian (August 7, 1850), and in the Millennial Star (April 15 to July 15, 1851), where it reached an even larger audience. Six months later, he defended Brigham Young in eastern newspapers. Kane was asked to provide recommendations and information about the Mormons to President Millard Fillmore. When Utah was granted a territorial government by Congress on September 9, 1850, Fillmore asked Kane to be the first governor. He declined and recommended Young. Throughout the 1850s, he promoted Utah statehood and defended the church's interests at every opportunity.

Kane married his British-born cousin Elizabeth Dennistown (or Dennistoun) Wood on April 21, 1853. Elizabeth Wood Kane completed a medical degree from the Philadelphia Female Medical College in 1883, though she never practiced independently. Two of their sons, Evan and William (later known as Thomas L., Jr.), and their daughter Harriet, became physicians.

The brother of General Kane, Elisha Kent Kane, was a civil engineer, and later an arctic explorer.

After Thomas Kane died in 1883, his widow built the home Anoatok in Kane, Pennsylvania.

In a work produced in 1902, historian William Alexander Linn, evidently believing that no non-Mormon would serve as an advocate for the group, asserted that Kane was a secret member of the LDS church and dated his baptism to his 1846 stay on the Missouri River. Kane, his family, and LDS Church leaders all stated that, despite his interest in Mormons and Mormon doctrine and practices, Kane never joined the LDS church. His wife Elizabeth Kane's letters and journals indicate that, to her distress, her husband was unable to state unequivocally that he was a Christian. Although he was raised Presbyterian, he never joined that or any church, nor practiced Presbyterianism as his wife did.

=== Utah War ===
In the winter of 1857–1858 Kane made a strenuous trip from the East Coast to Salt Lake City, Utah. Once there, he helped prevent bloodshed by mediating a dispute between the Mormons and the federal government, known as the Utah War. Mormonism, the practice of plural marriage, and the governance of the Utah territory were issues in the federal election of 1856. Responding to rumors and reports of Mormon misrule in Utah shortly after his inauguration in March 1857, President James Buchanan appointed a new Utah Territorial governor Alfred Cumming of Georgia, replacing Brigham Young. Responding to rumors (later proved false) that the Mormons were in rebellion against the US government, Buchanan sent an army of 2,500, with orders to place Cummings in Young's Governor Office by force if necessary.

Unfortunately, Buchanan did not officially notify Young about the change in appointment, and rumors of planned US army attacks on Utah communities flew just ahead of the troops. The Mormons, who had already been driven out of several states, were prepared to burn their settlements to the ground and resist yet another forced removal. The Mormons prepared to fight, activating the Nauvoo Legion (essentially all able-bodied men aged 15 to 60), and began preparing for a scorched-earth fighting withdrawal to southern Utah. 168 Mormon patrols located three Army supply trains following the army troops on the Oregon/California/Mormon trail which were attacked and burned by Nauvoo Legion members led by Lot Smith. This stalled the US Army advance at Fort Bridger in Wyoming for the winter of 1857–1858.

Earlier in the year, hearing of the "misunderstanding", Kane offered to mediate. As it was a heavy winter, he traveled under an alias to Utah by way of Panama, crossing the isthmus by the newly completed (1855) Panama Railroad and taking a ship north to southern California. He then went overland through San Bernardino, California to Salt Lake City over the strenuous southern branch of the California Trail (now Interstate 15), arriving in Salt Lake City in February 1858. Kane persuaded Young to accept Buchanan's appointment of Cumming as Territorial governor, and to present no opposition to the federal troops, called Johnston's Army, acting as escort. Kane then traveled to the army's winter base at Fort Bridger, and persuaded Governor Cumming to travel to Salt Lake City without his military escort. Cumming was courteously received by Young and Utah residents, and was shortly installed in his new office. The army came into Utah some weeks later and was bivouacked on vacant land that became Camp Floyd, 30 miles (48 km) southwest of Salt Lake City. The army left the territory in 1860 as the looming Civil War pulled in nearly all frontier troops.

While in Salt Lake City, Kane received news that his father had died in 1858. He remained in Utah until May 13, when he and an LDS escort returned east across the continent to make his report to President Buchanan.

=== Friendship with Young ===
Kane became a personal friend of Brigham Young, and stayed in contact with the church leader for many years. Kane visited Utah several times, advising Young on dealing with the federal government. In 1869 the railroad completed its connection to both coasts (by a tie-in in northern Utah), and in 1871 Young urged Kane and his family to visit:

General, now that the Atlantic and Pacific Railroad are completed and the facilities for traveling have made the trip across the plains comparatively a pleasure, may we hope to see you here soon? Let me assure you there is not one among the thousands who will cross the plains this season to whom the Latter-day Saints would more cordially extend the hand of warm welcome. Those who know you cherish for you the fondest recollection, while with all, your name is held in honorable remembrance.

— Brigham Young, April 16, 1871

Kane, his wife, and their two younger sons spent the winter of 1872 in Utah. They traveled throughout the territory and were Young's guests at his winter home in St. George, partially in an effort to regain Kane's failing health. During the winter, Kane and Young laid plans for the Mormon settlement of sections of Arizona and the Sonora Valley in Mexico. Kane also interviewed Young, gathering information for a planned biography (which he did not complete). In turn, Young consulted Kane as an attorney on dealing with federal charges pending against him.

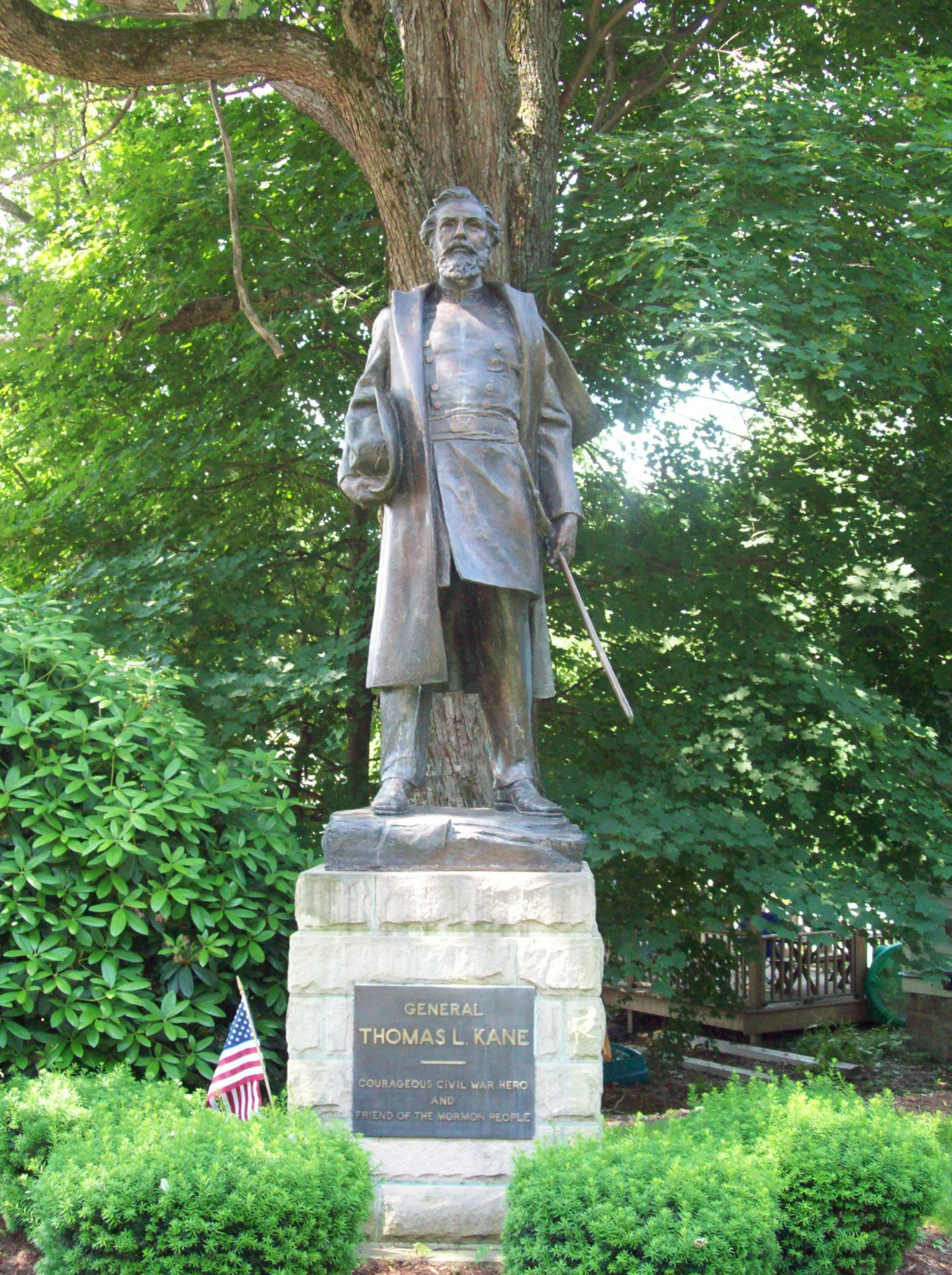
Statue of Thomas L. Kane, Kane Memorial Chapel, Kane, Pennsylvania

Elizabeth Kane corresponded with her family during her visit to Utah. Her father, William Wood, later published selected letters as a book titled Twelve Mormon Homes, since issued in several editions. The journal that she kept during her winter in St. George was edited and published in 1992 as Elizabeth Kane's St. George Journal. Kane returned to Utah upon Young's death in 1877, attending his funeral and offering condolences to family and church leaders. He also oversaw the execution of Young's will, which he had prepared, ensuring an appropriate separation of church and personal property. Young held a number of church properties in his own name due to the Morrill Anti-Bigamy Act of 1862, which made it illegal for the LDS church to own property valued at more than $50,000. Ownership of these properties was transferred to his successor in the presidency, John Taylor.

== Civil War service ==
By 1858, Thomas Kane's service to the Mormons mostly ended. As the Civil War began, Kane raised a mounted rifle regiment, the 42nd Pennsylvania Infantry, also referred to as the 13th Pennsylvania Reserves. He recruited woodsmen and lumbermen from western Pennsylvania—men who were experienced in the woods, could forage for themselves, and could shoot rifles. As the regiment was forming, one recruit ornamented his hat with a tail from a deer's carcass that he found in a butcher shop. Other men in the regiment liked this decoration and copied him, causing the regiment to be known as the "Bucktails". The men in the regiment built three large log rafts and one smaller one, and floated down the Susquehanna River to Harrisburg, where they were mustered in. On June 12, 1861, veteran Charles J. Biddle was named the Union regiment's colonel with Kane as lieutenant colonel. Kane was originally voted as colonel with Biddle as his lieutenant, but he resigned and requested that Biddle be made colonel, because Biddle had more military experience.

Kane has been described as a "visionary" of infantry tactics. He taught his men what would become known as "skirmisher tactics". They learned to scatter under fire and to make use of whatever cover the ground offered, and to fire only when they could see their targets. He stressed individual responsibility in his soldiers, a contradiction to the military thinking of the time. He held target practice, which was also an innovative idea, and drilled them in long-range firing, developing his men into fine sharpshooters.

The Bucktails were assigned to the Pennsylvania Reserves division of the V Corps of the Army of the Potomac. When Colonel Biddle resigned to enter United States Congress, Lt. Col. Kane took command. On December 20, 1861, Kane was wounded while leading a patrol at the Battle of Dranesville. A bullet struck the right side of his face, knocking out some teeth and producing long-term difficulties with his vision.

By the spring of 1862, Kane had partially recovered from his wound and returned to the Bucktails. They served as part of Brig. Gen. George Dashiell Bayard's cavalry in the Shenandoah Valley, fighting against Stonewall Jackson's Valley Campaign. At Harrisonburg, he and 104 picked riflemen were sent to the rescue of an ambushed regiment. Kane encountered three Confederate regiments on June 6, 1862. He was struck by a bullet that split the bone below his right knee and his men left him on the field. When he tried to rise after the fighting was over, a Confederate soldier broke his breastbone with a blow from the butt of his rifle and Kane, unconscious, was captured. He was exchanged for Williams C. Wickham in mid-August. He returned to duty in time for the Northern Virginia Campaign, but was so weakened that another officer led his regiment. He had to be helped onto his horse and was forced to walk using crutches; his Harrisonburg wound would reopen repeatedly for the next two years.

Kane was promoted to brigadier general of volunteers on September 7, 1862, and given command of the 2nd Brigade, 1st Division, XII Corps of the Army of the Potomac. This brigade was mustered out in March 1863 before Kane could lead it in combat. Kane was assigned a new brigade (now in the 2nd Division of the XII Corps) and saw action at Chancellorsville. After his horse stumbled in the Rapidan River and dumped him into the water on April 28, 1863, Kane developed a case of pneumonia. He was sent to a Baltimore, Maryland, hospital, where he remained through June. Upon hearing of General Robert E. Lee's second invasion of the North (Lee's Gettysburg campaign), Kane volunteered to convey intelligence to the commander of the Army of the Potomac, George Gordon Meade, and rose from his sickbed to join his men. On a difficult ride by railroad and buggy, he avoided capture by Maj. Gen. J.E.B. Stuart's cavalry by disguising himself as a civilian. He arrived at Gettysburg, Pennsylvania, on the morning of July 2, 1863.

Kane resumed command of his brigade, occupying a position on Culp's Hill, the right of the Union line. His men did not participate in the bloody fighting of July 2 because his division, commanded by Maj. Gen. John W. Geary, was pulled out of the line and sent to defend against Confederate attacks on the Union left. (Due to bad navigation by Geary, the column took a wrong turn and never did reach the fighting that day.) However, when his men returned to their hastily constructed breastworks on Culp's Hill that night, they found Confederate soldiers occupying them and Kane's corps commander ordered an assault for early the next morning to regain the position. Before the Union attack could be launched on July 3, the Confederates struck first, and Kane and his men met and repulsed them. During the action Kane fell ill, and the brigade's second-in-command, Colonel George A. Cobham, Jr., actively assisted in command. Although his brigade was victorious, Kane was a broken man and never recovered his health. He suffered from his festering facial wound, lingering chest problems, and impaired vision. He formally relinquished command the next day. He was then posted to Pittsburgh, Pennsylvania, where he supervised the draft depot. As he failed to recover his health, Kane resigned his commission on November 7, 1863. For his service at Gettysburg, he was named Brevet major general on March 13, 1865.

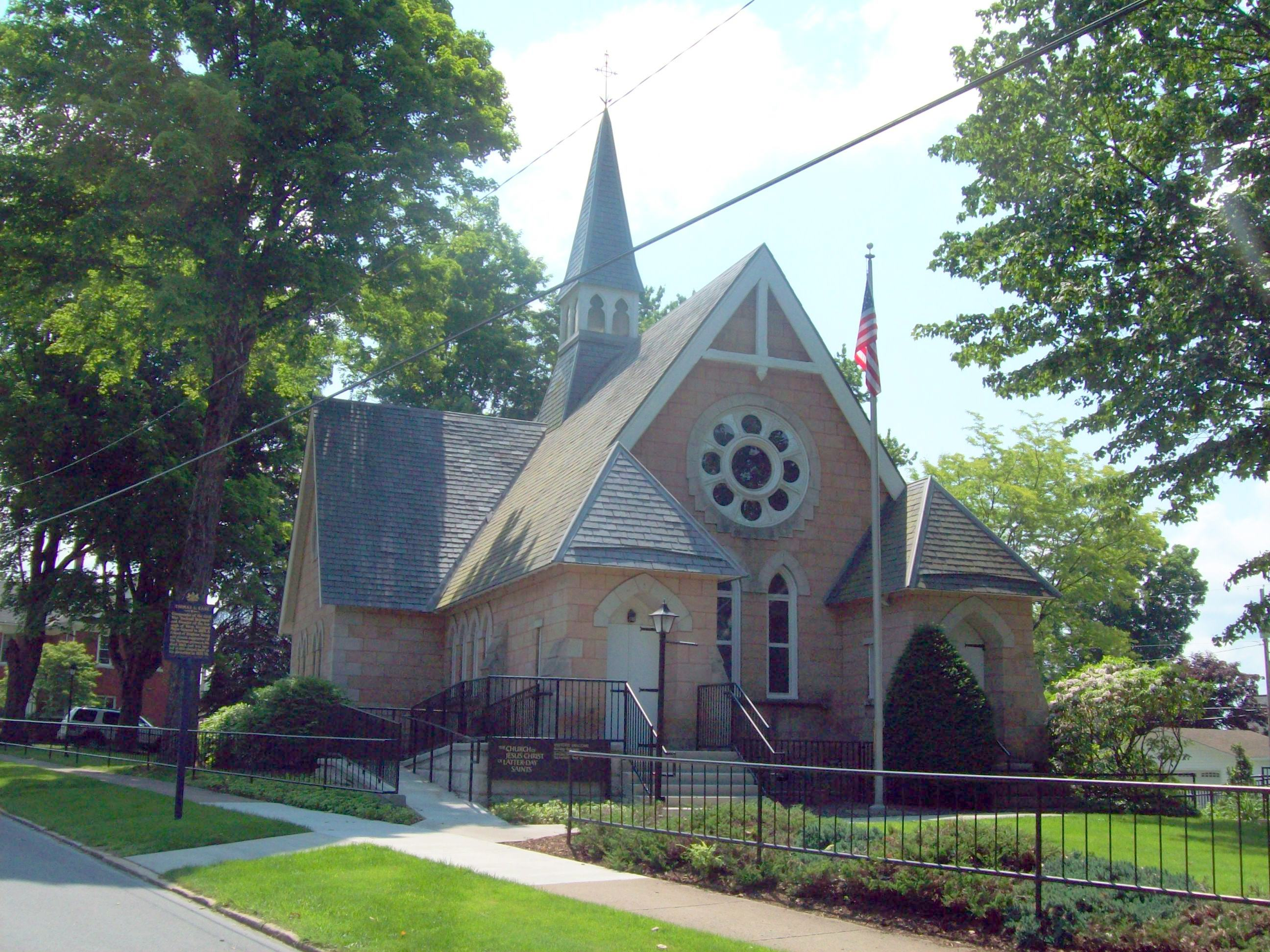
Thomas L. Kane Memorial Chapel

== Later life and death ==
After the Civil War, Kane and his wife moved to the frontier in western Pennsylvania, eventually owning over 100,000 acres (400 km^{2}) of timberland on which oil and gas were later discovered. Kane, whose father had been the attorney who incorporated the Pennsylvania Railroad, laid out railroad routes in that area and located the low summit over which the Philadelphia and Erie Railroad crosses the Alleghenies. Kane was involved in founding the community of Kane, Pennsylvania. Kane acted as a director of the Sunbury and Erie Railroad. He had served as secretary at the United States legation in Paris in 1842–1843. He was the first president of the Board of State Charities, and a member of the American Philosophical, American Geographical, and Pennsylvania Historical Societies. He was a Freemason. His later years were spent in charitable work and writing. He died of pneumonia in Philadelphia and is buried in Kane, Pennsylvania.

== Legacy and memorials ==
Kane County, Utah was named for Thomas L. Kane, as was the Kanesville Tabernacle in Council Bluffs, Iowa. The Kane Historic Preservation Society maintains as a historic site the Thomas L. Kane Memorial Chapel, in Kane, Pennsylvania, in recognition of Kane's friendship and assistance. Kane was a founder of the Borough and is buried in the chapel. In addition, a bronze statue of Thomas L. Kane is displayed in Utah's Capitol Building, identified as a "Friend of the Mormons". An area of the Hooper Ward, in northeast Hooper, Utah was divided off and was named Kanesville in honor of Thomas L. Kane. The area was known as Kanesville which was later incorporated into Hooper, Utah and Farr West, Utah. A stone and bronze memorial stands behind a church building with his likeness.

== Publications ==
- Kane, Thomas L. (1850). The Mormons: A Discourse Delivered Before the Historical Society of Pennsylvania, March 26, 1850. Philadelphia: King & Baird. OCLC 367799887.
- Kane, Thomas L. (1868). Alaska and the Polar Regions: Lecture Before the American Geographical Society, in New York City, Thursday Evening, May 7, 1868. New York NY: Journeymen Printers' Co-operative Assoc. OCLC 423584459.
- Kane, Thomas L. (1877). Coahuila: Read Before the American Philosophical Society, January 19, 1877. Philadelphia. OCLC 1538332.
- Kane, Thomas L. (1937). Oscar Osburn Winther (ed.). The Private Papers and Diary of Thomas Leiper Kane, a Friend of the Mormons. San Francisco CA: Gelber-Lilienthal, Inc. OCLC 13850314.
- Kane, Thomas L.; Young, Brigham (2015). Grow, Matthew J.; Walker, Ronald W. (eds.). The Prophet and the Reformer: The Letters of Brigham Young and Thomas L. Kane. New York NY: Oxford University Press USA. ISBN 978-0-19-539773-4.

== See also ==
- List of American Civil War generals (Union)
- Thomas L. Kane Memorial Chapel

== Bibliography ==
- Allen, James B.; Glen M. Leonard. The Story of the Latter-day Saints. Deseret Book Co., Salt Lake City UT, 1976. ISBN 0-87747-594-6.
- Bowen, Norman R., editor. A Gentile Account of Life in Utah's Dixie, 1872–73, Elizabeth Kane's St. George Journal. Tanner Trust Fund, University of Utah Library, Salt Lake City UT, 1995. ISBN 1-56085-104-X.
- Eicher, John H., and Eicher, David J., Civil War High Commands, Stanford University Press, 2001, ISBN 0-8047-3641-3.
- Grow, Matthew J. "Liberty to the Downtrodden": Thomas L. Kane, Romantic Reformer. Yale University Press, New Haven CT, 2009.
- Holmes, Gail. "Kane, Thomas Leiper" The Biographical Dictionary of Iowa. University of Iowa Press, 2009.
- Kane, Elizabeth Wood, with Everett L. Cooley, editor, Twelve Mormon Homes: Visited in Succession on a Journey through Utah to Arizona. Tanner Trust Fund, University of Utah Library, Salt Lake City UT, 1974 [1874]. OCLC 1499817.
- Ludlow, Daniel H., editor. Church History, Selections from the Encyclopedia of Mormonism. Deseret Book Co., Salt Lake City UT, 1995. ISBN 0-87579-924-8.
- Thomas L. Kane Papers. Held by the American Philosophical Society, Philadelphia PA. Facsimile copies held by the Special Collections Department, University of Utah Library.
- Tagg, Larry, The Generals of Gettysburg, Savas Publishing, 1998, ISBN 1-882810-30-9.
- Tyler, Daniel. A Concise History of the Mormon Battalion in the Mexican War, 1846-1847. Salt Lake City, 1881.
