= Bradford, Pennsylvania =

City in Pennsylvania, US

- City
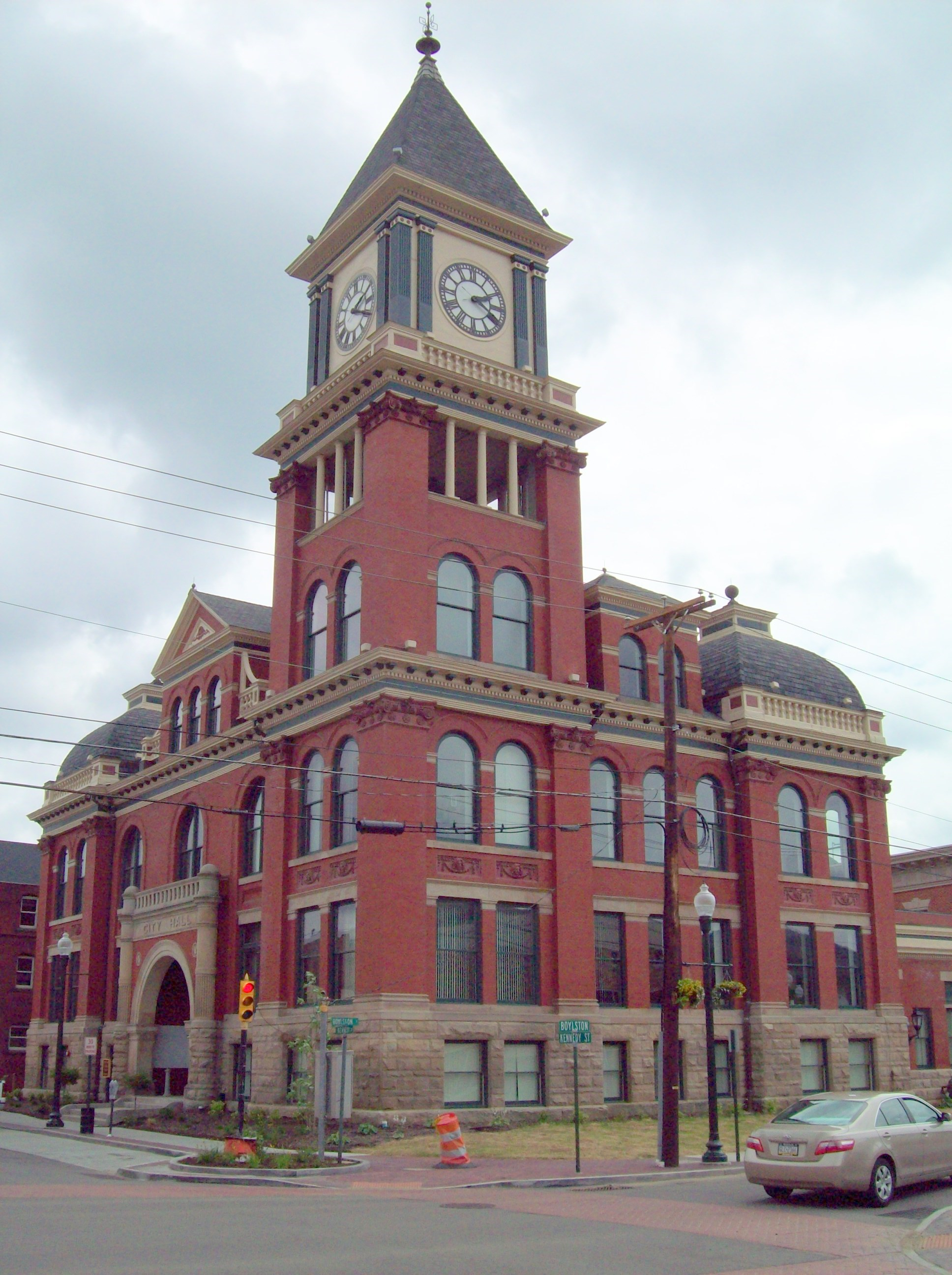
- Old City Hall

- Seal

- Location in McKean County and the state of Pennsylvania
- Coordinates: 41°57′33″N 78°38′41″W
- Country: United States
- State: Pennsylvania
- County: McKean
- Settled: 1823
- Incorporated: 1837

Government
  - Type: City Council
  - Mayor: Tom Riel

Area
  - Total: 3.40 sq mi (8.80 km^{2})
  - Land: 3.33 sq mi (8.62 km^{2})
  - Water: 0.073 sq mi (0.19 km^{2})

Population (2020)
  - Total: 7,849
  - Density: 2,359.7/sq mi (911.07/km^{2})
- Time zone: UTC−5 (Eastern (EST))
  - Summer (DST): UTC−4 (EDT)
- ZIP Code: 16701
- Area code: 814
- FIPS code: 42-08040
- Website: bradfordpa.org

Bradford is a city in McKean County, Pennsylvania, United States. It is located close to the border with New York state and approximately 78 miles (126 km) south of Buffalo, New York. Home to an oil refinery, Zippo headquarters and a University of Pittsburgh branch campus, Bradford is the principal city in the Bradford, PA Micropolitan Statistical Area. The population was 7,849 at the 2020 census, down from 8,770 in 2010.

== History ==
Settled in 1823, Bradford was chartered as a city in 1837 and emerged as a wild oil boomtown in the Pennsylvania oil rush in the late 19th century. The area's Pennsylvania Grade crude oil has superior qualities and is free of asphaltic constituents, contains only trace amounts of sulfur and nitrogen, and has excellent characteristics for refining into lubricants. The Bradford & Foster Brook Railway was built in 1876 as one of, if not the first, monorails in America, when Bradford was a booming oil town. World-famous Kendall racing oils were produced in Bradford.

Bradford was the site of an important step in the development of personal aviation. In the 1930s, the Taylor Brothers Aircraft Corporation produced an airplane called the Taylor Cub in Bradford. After a fire at the factory, the company was bought by William T. Piper. After relocating his factory to Lock Haven, Pennsylvania, Piper resumed production of a revised design of the airplane first produced in Bradford, which became the world-famous Piper Cub.

The population peaked at 19,306 in 1930, declining to 7,849 as of 2020. Two adjoining townships, home to approximately 9,000 people, make the current population of Greater Bradford about 17,000. Famous Bradfordians include the opera singer Marilyn Horne, the Hall of Fame baseball player Rube Waddell and the five-time All-Star football player Stew Barber. A famous perpetual motion machine hoax was created in Bradford in 1897 by J.M. Aldrich. The hoax was exposed in the July 1, 1899, issue of the Scientific American magazine. Ultimately, Aldrich was sentenced to four months in the county jail.

The Bradford Armory, Bradford Downtown Historic District, Bradford Old City Hall, and Rufus Barrett Stone House are listed on the National Register of Historic Places.

== Geography ==
Bradford is located in northern McKean County on U.S. Route 219, three miles (5 km) south of the New York border and 10 miles (16 km) south of Route 219's junction with Interstate 86. To the south, US 219 leads 43 miles (69 km) to Ridgway. Pennsylvania Route 46 has its northern terminus in Bradford, leading southeast 17 miles (27 km) to Smethport, the McKean county seat. Route 346 passes through the center of Bradford as Washington Street and Boylston Street; it leads west 17 miles (27 km) to the Allegheny River at the New York border and east the same distance to Eldred.

According to the U.S. Census Bureau, Bradford has a total area of 3.4 square miles (8.8 km^{2}), of which 0.07 square miles (0.18 km^{2}), or 2.12%, are water. Bradford is situated in a valley in the Allegheny Mountains and is surrounded by woods and steep hills. Two branches of Tunungwant Creek enter the city, merge and flow into the Allegheny River 10 miles (16 km) to the north in New York.

Bradford Regional Airport is located approximately 15 miles (24 km) south of the city, at Mount Alton. The elevation of the city is 1,443 feet (440 meters) above sea level, but the airport is at an elevation of 2,142 feet (653 meters) above sea level. Because of the higher elevation, the airport often has the coldest reported air temperatures in Pennsylvania. The airport has one of the few National Weather Service stations across the entire northern tier of the state. Temperatures in the city are typically three to seven degrees warmer than at the airport due to the difference in elevation, and actual city temperatures are more representative of other communities in northern Pennsylvania and southwestern New York than are the airport's.

== Climate ==
Bradford has a humid continental climate (Dfb) with cold, long, snowy winters and warm, humid summers. The record low in Bradford is −37 °F (−38 °C) set in February 1934 and the record high is 99 °F (37 °C) in July 2011. Other notable extremes include a −9 °F (−23 °C) recording on November 29, 1930, and on November 30, 1929, a −3 °F (−19 °C) recording on April 1, 1923, an 83 °F (28 °C) degree reading on March 30, 1986, and March 29, 1998, and a 28 °F (−2 °C) degree reading on August 29, 1982. Late fall/early winter is especially snowy due to heavy amounts of lake effect snow from Lake Erie and, to a lesser extent, Lake Ontario. Lake effect snow during cold snaps in early spring also helps to raise snowfall totals.

Climate data for Bradford, Pennsylvania, 1991–2020 normals, extremes 1941–present
Month	Jan	Feb	Mar	Apr	May	Jun	Jul	Aug	Sep	Oct	Nov	Dec	Year
Record high °F (°C)	69 (21)	73 (23)	83 (28)	87 (31)	93 (34)	93 (34)	99 (37)	93 (34)	95 (35)	85 (29)	79 (26)	68 (20)	99 (37)
Mean maximum °F (°C)	54.2 (12.3)	54.1 (12.3)	66.0 (18.9)	77.6 (25.3)	84.7 (29.3)	87.0 (30.6)	88.5 (31.4)	86.3 (30.2)	84.1 (28.9)	76.9 (24.9)	66.9 (19.4)	54.6 (12.6)	89.6 (32.0)
Mean daily maximum °F (°C)	30.6 (−0.8)	33.2 (0.7)	42.2 (5.7)	56.0 (13.3)	67.8 (19.9)	75.5 (24.2)	79.1 (26.2)	77.6 (25.3)	71.0 (21.7)	58.9 (14.9)	46.3 (7.9)	35.2 (1.8)	56.1 (13.4)
Daily mean °F (°C)	21.7 (−5.7)	23.2 (−4.9)	31.5 (−0.3)	43.8 (6.6)	55.1 (12.8)	63.4 (17.4)	67.1 (19.5)	65.7 (18.7)	59.1 (15.1)	47.7 (8.7)	37.2 (2.9)	27.5 (−2.5)	45.3 (7.4)
Mean daily minimum °F (°C)	12.9 (−10.6)	13.1 (−10.5)	20.7 (−6.3)	31.7 (−0.2)	42.4 (5.8)	51.3 (10.7)	55.1 (12.8)	53.8 (12.1)	47.1 (8.4)	36.6 (2.6)	28.0 (−2.2)	19.8 (−6.8)	34.4 (1.3)
Mean minimum °F (°C)	−10.1 (−23.4)	−7.6 (−22.0)	−1.1 (−18.4)	17.7 (−7.9)	26.9 (−2.8)	36.2 (2.3)	43.5 (6.4)	42.4 (5.8)	34.0 (1.1)	24.1 (−4.4)	11.8 (−11.2)	1.2 (−17.1)	−13.3 (−25.2)
Record low °F (°C)	−36 (−38)	−29 (−34)	−22 (−30)	6 (−14)	18 (−8)	26 (−3)	32 (0)	28 (−2)	18 (−8)	12 (−11)	−4 (−20)	−22 (−30)	−36 (−38)
Average precipitation inches (mm)	3.84 (98)	2.84 (72)	3.33 (85)	4.20 (107)	4.50 (114)	4.79 (122)	4.95 (126)	4.56 (116)	4.19 (106)	4.38 (111)	3.91 (99)	4.08 (104)	49.57 (1,259)
Average snowfall inches (cm)	20.5 (52)	15.6 (40)	10.0 (25)	2.9 (7.4)	0.1 (0.25)	0.0 (0.0)	0.0 (0.0)	0.0 (0.0)	0.0 (0.0)	0.8 (2.0)	7.0 (18)	18.4 (47)	75.3 (191)
Average extreme snow depth inches (cm)	11.9 (30)	11.7 (30)	9.6 (24)	2.1 (5.3)	0.0 (0.0)	0.0 (0.0)	0.0 (0.0)	0.0 (0.0)	0.0 (0.0)	0.6 (1.5)	4.7 (12)	10.5 (27)	17.7 (45)
Average precipitation days (≥ 0.01 in)	17.1	13.0	12.4	12.8	13.3	13.2	12.4	11.4	11.4	14.2	14.5	16.4	162.1
Average snowy days (≥ 0.1 in)	10.6	8.7	5.4	1.5	0.1	0.0	0.0	0.0	0.0	0.5	4.0	8.7	39.5
Source: NOAA

== Demographics ==
Historical population
Census	Pop.	Note	%±
1880	9,197		—
1890	10,514		14.3%
1900	15,029		42.9%
1910	14,544		−3.2%
1920	15,525		6.7%
1930	19,306		24.4%
1940	17,691		−8.4%
1950	17,354		−1.9%
1960	15,061		−13.2%
1970	12,672		−15.9%
1980	11,211		−11.5%
1990	9,625		−14.1%
2000	9,175		−4.7%
2010	8,770		−4.4%
2020	7,849		−10.5%

=== 2020 census ===
As of the 2020 census, Bradford had a population of 7,849. The median age was 37.8 years. 24.1% of residents were under the age of 18 and 17.2% of residents were 65 years of age or older. For every 100 females there were 92.7 males, and for every 100 females age 18 and over there were 90.6 males age 18 and over.

99.5% of residents lived in urban areas, while 0.5% lived in rural areas.

There were 3,296 households in Bradford, of which 27.5% had children under the age of 18 living in them. Of all households, 30.1% were married-couple households, 23.8% were households with a male householder and no spouse or partner present, and 34.3% were households with a female householder and no spouse or partner present. About 37.7% of all households were made up of individuals and 14.0% had someone living alone who was 65 years of age or older.

There were 3,826 housing units, of which 13.9% were vacant. The homeowner vacancy rate was 2.6% and the rental vacancy rate was 13.0%.

Racial composition as of the 2020 census
Race	Number	Percent
White	7,129	90.8%
Black or African American	72	0.9%
American Indian and Alaska Native	47	0.6%
Asian	50	0.6%
Native Hawaiian and Other Pacific Islander	2	0.0%
Some other race	71	0.9%
Two or more races	478	6.1%
Hispanic or Latino (of any race)	154	2.0%

=== 2000 census ===
As of the 2000 census, there were 9,175 people, 3,922 households, and 2,247 families residing in the city. The population density was 2,659.7 inhabitants per square mile (1,026.9/km^{2}). There were 4,371 housing units at an average density of 1,267.1 per square mile (489.2/km^{2}). The racial makeup of the city was 97.74% White, 0.49% African American, 0.31% Native American, 0.52% Asian, 0.03% Pacific Islander, 0.27% from other races, and 0.63% from two or more races. Hispanic or Latino of any race were 0.95% of the population.

There are 3,922 households, out of which 29.4% had children under the age of 18, 36.9% were married couples living together, 14.8% had a female householder with no husband present, and 42.7% of households were non-families. 36.3% of all households were made up of individuals, and 15.2% had someone living alone who was 65 years of age or older. The average household size was 2.27 and the average family size was 2.93.

In the city, the population was spread out, with 25.4% under the age of 18, 9.4% from 18 to 24, 28.0% from 25 to 44, 20.0% from 45 to 64, and 17.1% who were 65 years of age or older. The median age was 36 years. For every 100 females, there were 88.4 males. For every 100 females age 18 and over, there were 83.7 males.

The median income for a household in the city was $26,463, and the median income for a family was $32,828. Males had a median income of $30,661 versus $21,250 for females. The per capita income for the city was $17,537. About 16.9% of families and 20.7% of the population was below the poverty line, including 28.1% of those under age 18 and 9.5% of those age 65 or over.

== Economy ==
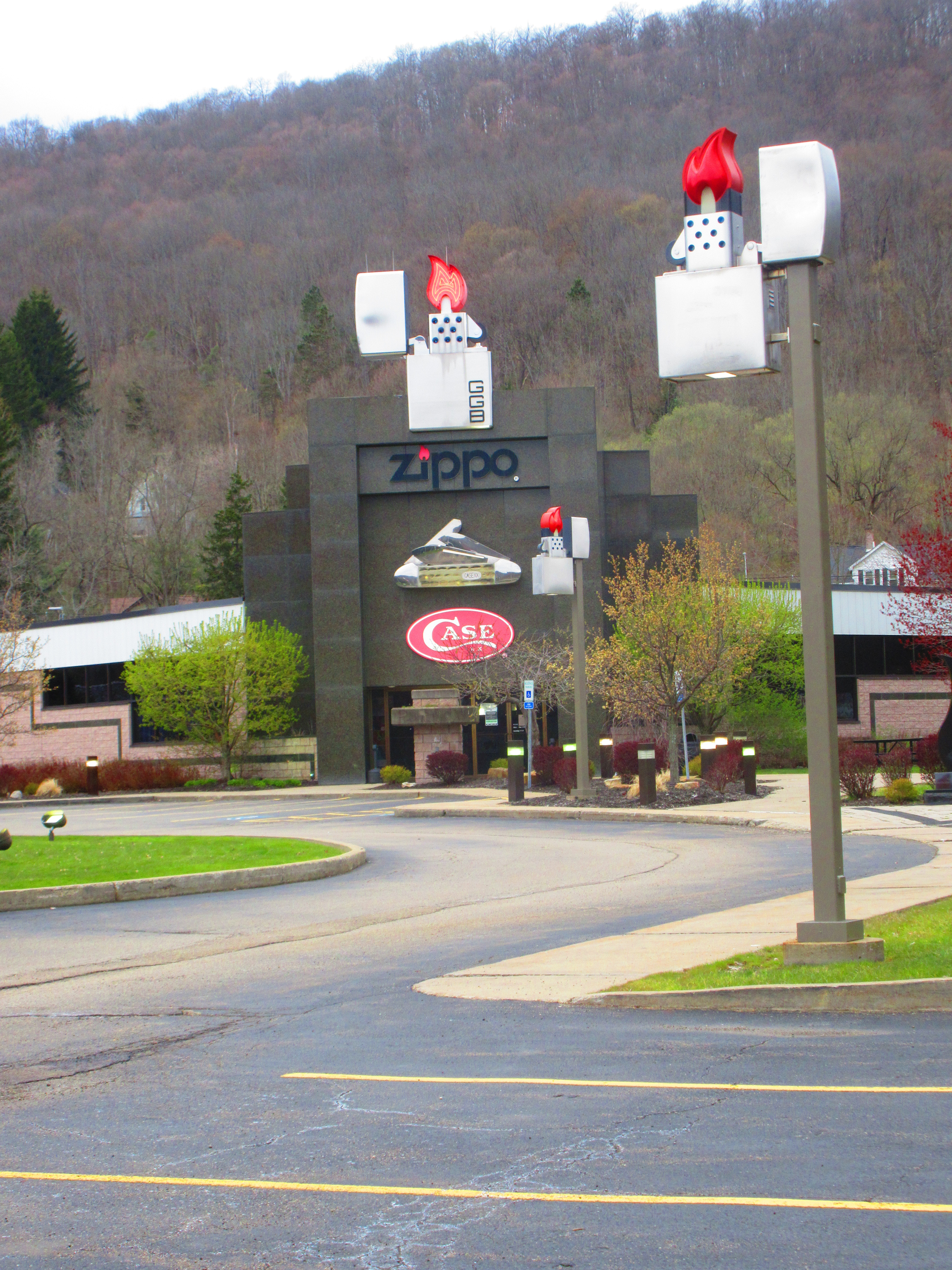
Zippo museum & manufacturing facility.

Bradford is the home of Zippo (est. 1932), a manufacturer of collectible pocket lighters, and Case (est. in Bradford in 1905), which is owned by Zippo and makes hunting, fishing, folding pocketknives, and collectibles. In February 2009, the two companies employed 1,117 people, but significant layoffs have taken place since. After Zippo and Case, the second largest employer is Bradford Regional Medical Center (BRMC), which employed 759 in February 2009. BRMC underwent a significant campus expansion in 2006. However in 2026, the closing of the ER, surgical center, maternity ward, psychiatric ward, and other services the community relied on throughout the year significantly affected this. Other major employers in February 2009 included Beacon Light (682 employees), which is responsible for overseeing troubled youth. Bradford Area School District (474) and Wal-Mart (378). FCI McKean nearby employed 301 at that time.

The city is home to American Refining Group (formerly Kendall), and their line of specialty products. Along with being Bradford's longest running active business, ARG is the oldest continuously operating refinery in the United States. It celebrated its 125th anniversary in 2006. Since ARG purchased the refinery in the mid-1990s, employment has almost doubled to just under 300 in February 2009.

Bradford has a four-year college, the University of Pittsburgh at Bradford (Pitt-Bradford), which in the fall term 2009 had 1,455 full-time students and 202 part-time students for a total enrollment of 1,657, with 217 full-time employees and 106 part-time employees. Almost 900 students live on campus.

The city's shopping mall and many of its chain businesses are located just north of the city line in Foster Brook.

== Arts and entertainment ==
The Bradford Creative and Performing Arts Center season runs from September to March. The Bromeley Family Theater at The University of Pittsburgh at Bradford hosts many events in the university's Spectrum Series that brings authors, artists, musicians, recitalists and performance groups to campus with all events open to the public. Theater productions are staged by the theater departments at Pitt-Bradford and the high school and by the Bradford Little Theater (BLT), which celebrated its 10th anniversary in 2006. BLT also operates Togi's Playhouse for smaller productions. An annual community talent show, Kiwanis Kapers, occurs in the fall.

In May 2017, the Marilyn Horne Museum and Exhibit Center opened in downtown Bradford. Part of the University of Pittsburgh at Bradford, the 3,400 square-foot exhibition space celebrates the life and career of American mezzo-soprano, Marilyn Horne. The museum highlights objects from Horne's personal archive, which is housed at the University of Pittsburgh.

Annual festivals include Stinkfest (a festival promoting leek cuisine), Summer Daze (formerly known as Summerfest), Autumn Daze, the Italian Festival, the Zippo/Case International Swap Meet (biennial, with Zippo Days held in off years) and the Crook Farm Country Fair. In early August, the annual Big 30 Charity high school all star football game takes place at Parkway Field, where a million-dollar artificial playing surface was installed in 2008. In 2009, for the first time, National Night Out was a significant event in Bradford, coinciding with Taste of Bradford. A First Night celebration is held on New Year's Eve, complete with a ball drop of its own.

== Recreation ==
Bradford is located within miles of the Allegany State Park in New York, the largest state park in New York, and the Allegheny National Forest, the only national forest in Pennsylvania.

The Tuna Valley Trails Association has constructed several miles of trails in the community, with a master plan of over 50 miles (80 km) currently being planned, funded and implemented.

Parks in the city include Callahan Park, with swimming pools, tennis courts and an enclosed ice skating rink, and Hanley Park, with a large playground, horseshoe pits and a skate park.

The surrounding area has two golf courses, the Pennhills Club in Bradford Township and Pine Acres Golf Course near Marshburg.

== Education ==
Its school district is Bradford Area School District.

University of Pittsburgh at Bradford is in Bradford Township.

== Notable people ==
- Jay and Jules Allen, film exhibitors
- Stew Barber, collegiate and professional football player; born in Bradford on June 14, 1939
- George Grant Blaisdell, founder of the Zippo lighter company; born in Bradford on June 5, 1895
- Edith Dobie, historian
- John Gilmore, opera singer
- Inez Barbour Hadley, soprano singer, born in Bradford in 1879
- Stoo Hample, author and cartoonist, lived in Bradford as a teenager and graduated from Bradford High School
- Marilyn Horne, American mezzo-soprano opera singer; born in Bradford on January 16, 1934
- Henry Clinton Hunt, Wisconsin State Assemblyman; born in Bradford on January 27, 1840
- Larry Peace, NFL player
- J. Howard Pew, president of Sun Oil Company (Sunoco) for 35 years and noted philanthropist; born in Bradford in 1882
- Todd Schlopy, feature film cameraman, briefly an NFL player
- Philip M. Shannon, Mayor of Bradford, oil businessman, and millionaire; born in Bradford on September 2, 1846
- Rube Waddell, Baseball Hall of Fame pitcher; born in Bradford on October 13, 1876
- A. Leo Weil, lawyer
- Marjorie West, a child of 4 who disappeared in 1938
