= Enoch A. Curtis =

American architect

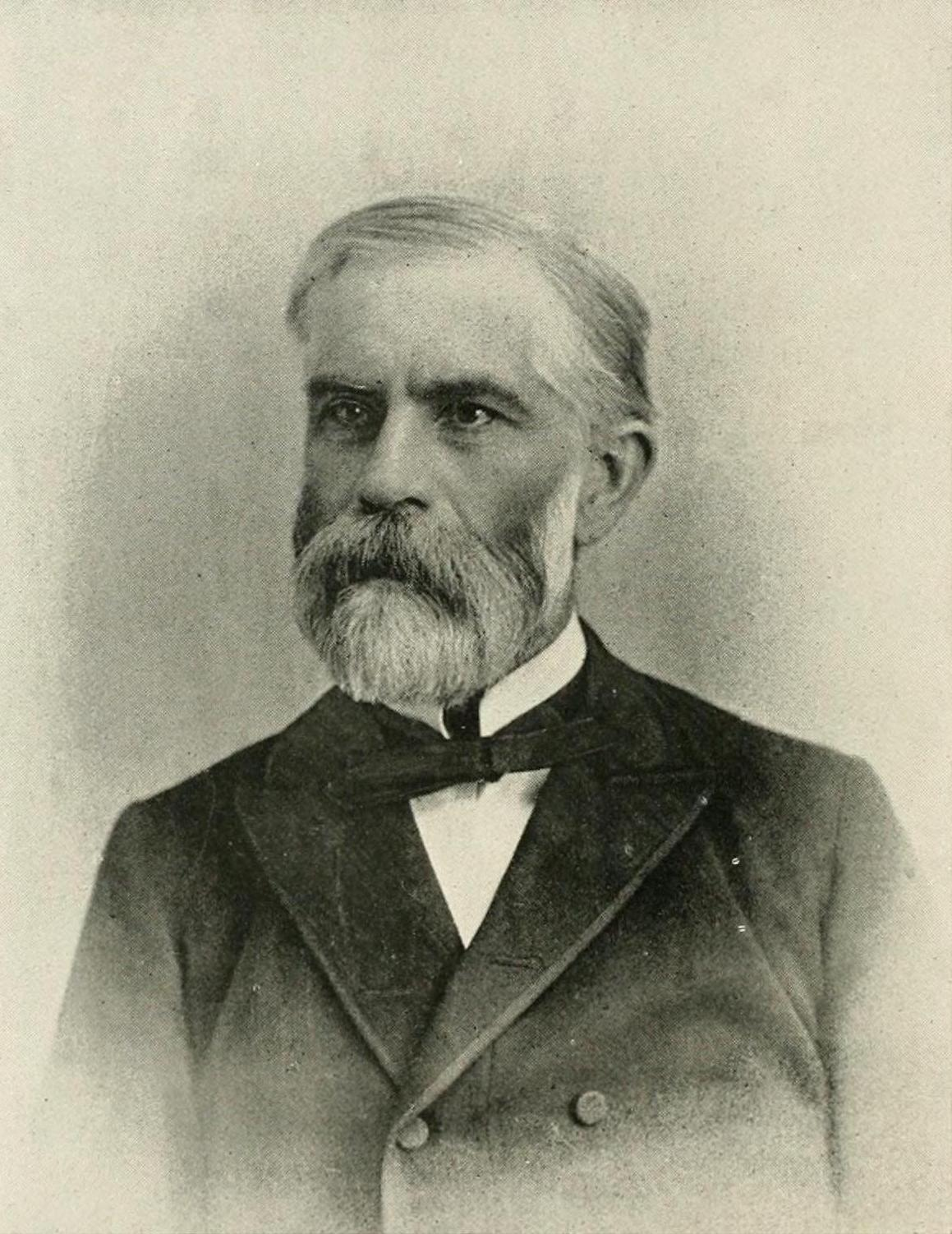
- Enoch A. Curtis, circa 1891
- Born: July 19, 1836; Busti, New York
- Died: October 4, 1907 (aged 71); Fredonia, New York
- Occupation: Architect

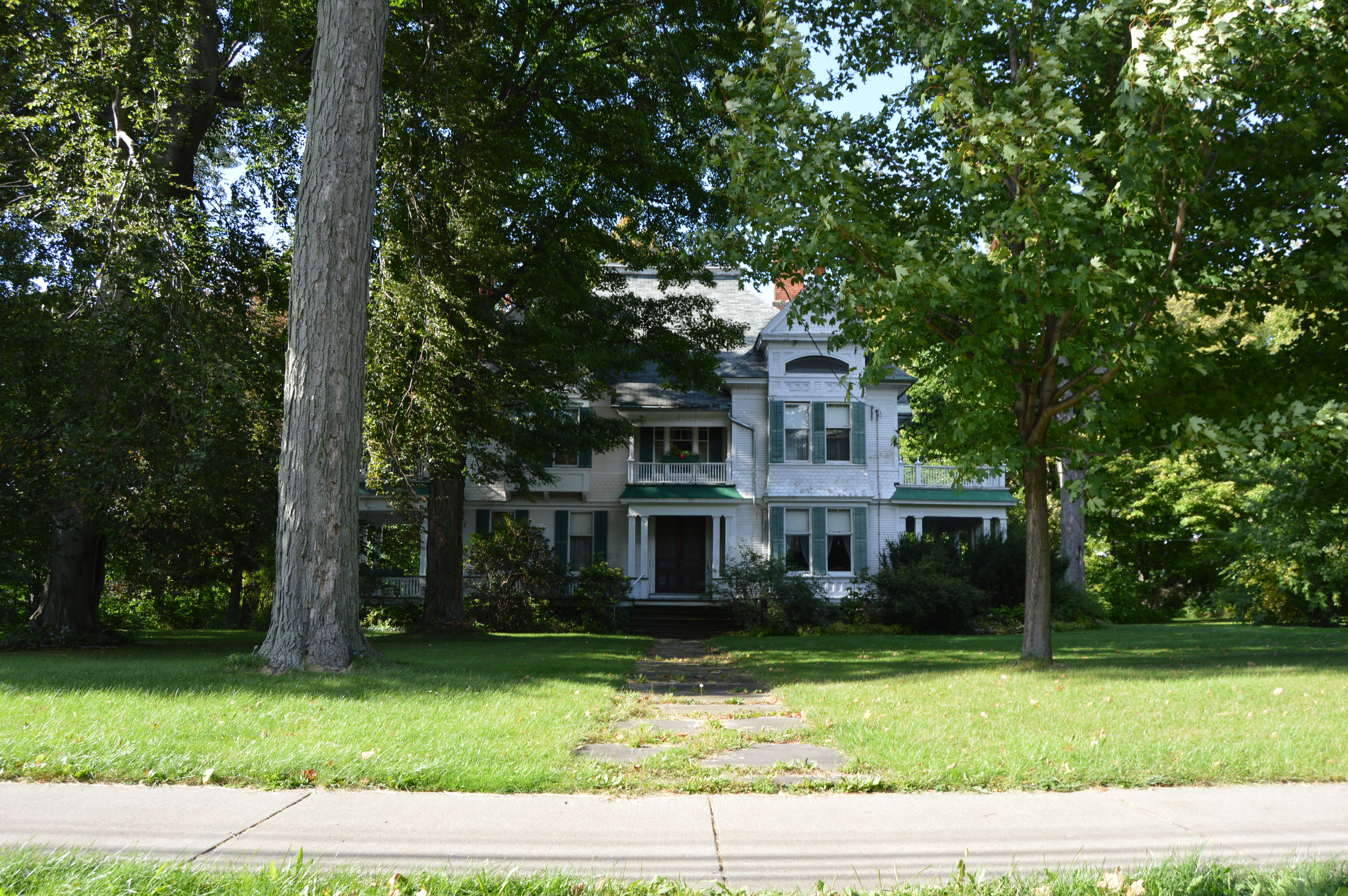
The Reuben Gridley Wright house in Westfield, New York, built in 1883.

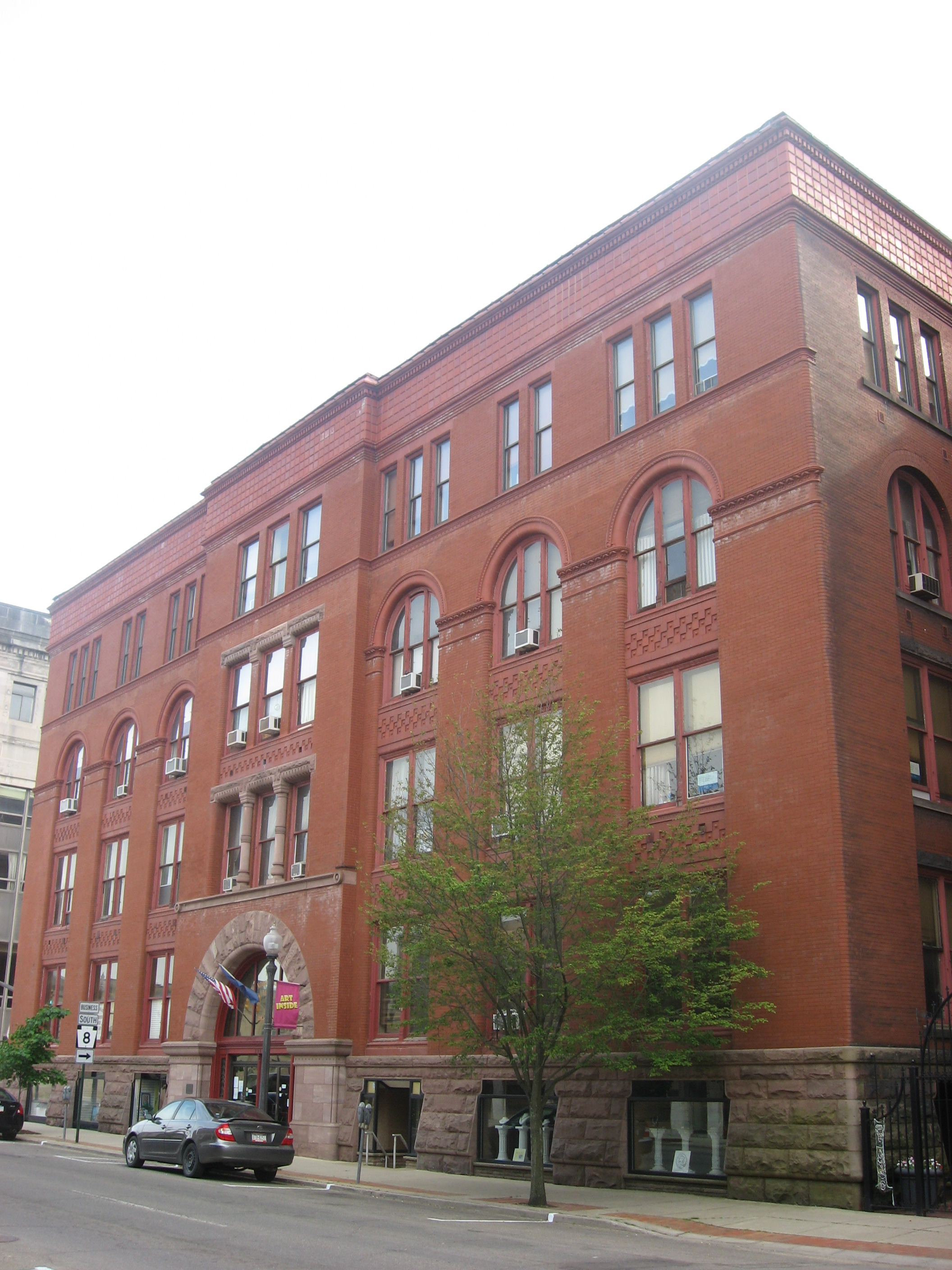
The National Transit Building in Oil City, Pennsylvania, designed by Curtis & Archer and completed in 1890.

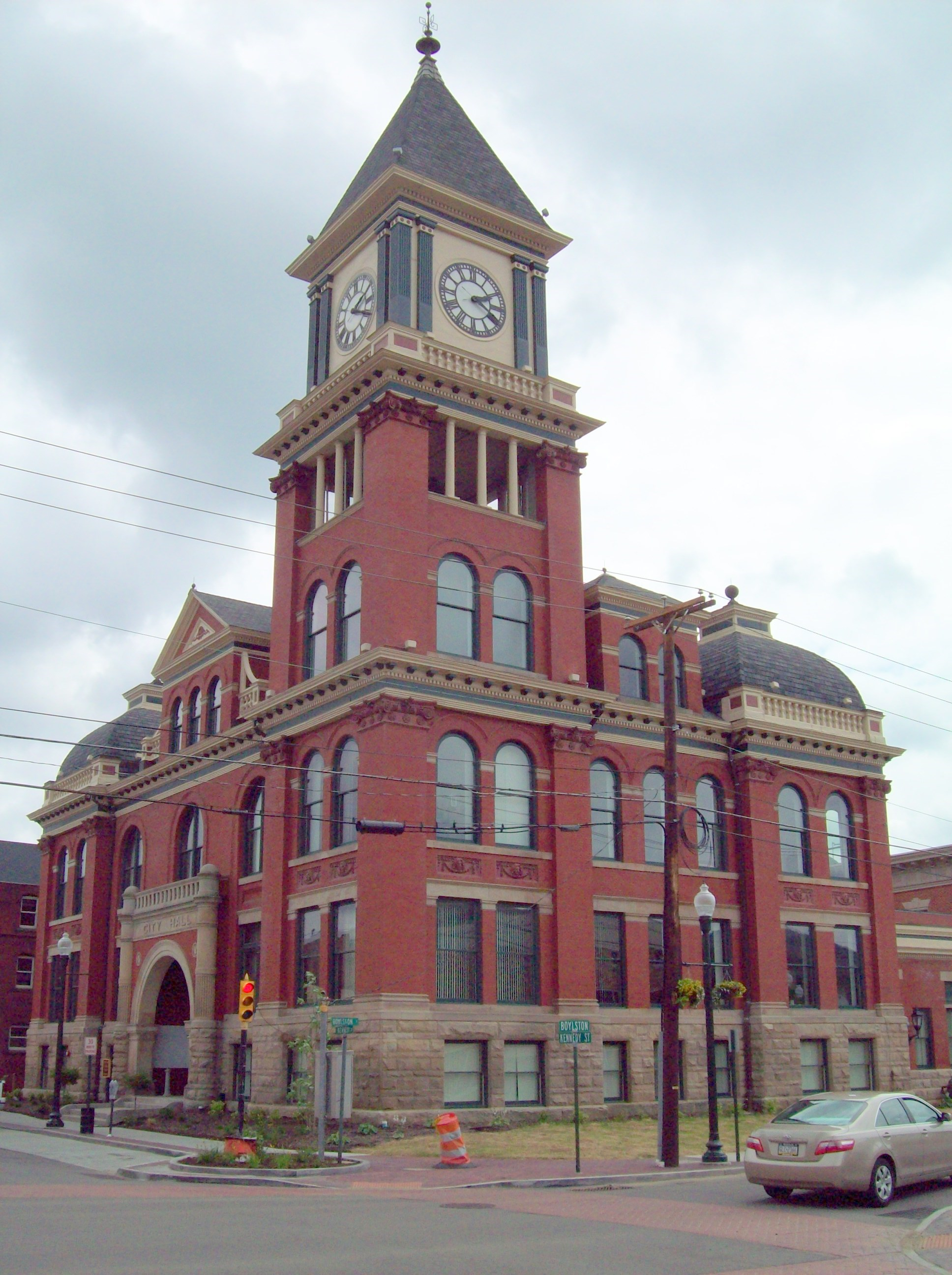
The Old City Hall in Bradford, Pennsylvania, designed by Curtis and built in 1897.

Enoch A. Curtis (1836–1907) was an American architect practicing in Fredonia, New York during the nineteenth century.

== Life and career ==
Enoch Arnold Curtis was born July 19, 1836, in Busti, New York to Isaac Curtis, a farmer, and Susan (Hunter) Curtis. He was raised on the farm, educated in the academy at Jamestown, and trained as a carpenter. In 1862 he enlisted in the 112th New York Infantry Regiment of the Union Army and was commissioned a captain. He was heavily injured during the Battle of Cold Harbor in 1864, and was honorably discharged due to his wounds. He settled in Fredonia, and while recovering he ran a hardware business and took up the study of architecture. In 1867 he opened an office as an architect. Curtis practiced in Fredonia for a period of forty years. In 1888 he formed the firm of Curtis & Archer with William H. Archer, which was dissolved in 1890 when Archer moved to Buffalo. He later had a successful practice in Canada. Curtis frequently drew from pattern books for his designs.

In 1896 Curtis was a delegate to the Republican National Convention in St. Louis which nominated William McKinley for president, and was an active figure in the ensuing successful campaign. In 1901, following the assassination of McKinley, Curtis was appointed a member of the committee in charge of the design and construction of the McKinley Monument in Buffalo, designed by Carrère & Hastings and dedicated a month prior to his death in 1907.

Curtis joined the Western Association of Architects in 1888, which merged with the American Institute of Architects in 1889, though he only remained a member of the AIA until 1891.

== Personal life ==
Though he was discharged as a major, in 1867 he was brevetted a major by Governor Reuben Fenton.

Curtis was married in 1855 to Mary Jane Elizabeth Norton of Ashville, New York, and they had two daughters. Curtis died October 4, 1907, in Fredonia.

== Legacy ==
From his office in Fredonia, Curtis built extensively in western New York and Pennsylvania. At least four buildings designed by Curtis, alone and with Archer, have been listed on the United States National Register of Historic Places. Several others contribute to listed historic districts.

== Architectural works ==
- American (IOOF) Block, (Note: A contributing property to the Fredonia Commons Historic District, NRHP-listed in 1978.) 5–15 E Main St, Fredonia, New York (1869–70)
- Jairus H. Winsor house, 314 Union St, Titusville, Pennsylvania (1871, demolished)
- German Reformed Church (former), 102 Brook St, Titusville, Pennsylvania (1872)
- Elm Street School (former), 617 W Elm St, Titusville, Pennsylvania (1873)
- Emlenton Presbyterian Church, (Note: A contributing property to the Emlenton Historic District, NRHP-listed in 1997.) 508 Main St, Emlenton, Pennsylvania (1874)
- Bradford Oil Exchange Building, 33 Main St, Bradford, Pennsylvania (1878, altered)
- Aaron O. Putnam house, 134 Temple St, Fredonia, New York (1878)
- Horace White house, 3728 NY-83, Laona, New York (circa 1878)
- Titusville Oil Exchange Building, 128 W Spring St, Titusville, Pennsylvania (1880–81, demolished 1956)
- Benjamin Brundred house, (Note: A contributing property to the Oil City South Side Historic District, NRHP-listed in 1997.) 315 W 1st St, Oil City, Pennsylvania (1883)
- Reuben Gridley Wright Farm Complex, 233 E Main St, Westfield, New York (1883, NRHP 1983)
- Christ Episcopal Church, 16 Central Ave, Oil City, Pennsylvania (1886–87)
- First Presbyterian Church, (Note: A contributing property to the Titusville Historic District, NRHP-listed in 1985.) 216 N Franklin St, Titusville, Pennsylvania (1887)
- Christ's Church, (Note: Credited to Curtis & Archer.) (Note: A contributing property to the Academy Hill Historic District, NRHP-listed in 1999.) 206 Seneca St, Oil City, Pennsylvania (1889–90 and 1896, NRHP 1978) 122 N Maple Ave, Greensburg, Pennsylvania (1889–91)
- National Transit Building and Annex, (Note: A contributing property to the Oil City Downtown Commercial Historic District, NRHP-listed in 1997.) 206 Seneca St, Oil City, Pennsylvania (1889–90 and 1896, NRHP 1978)
- Belmont Hotel, 40–48 Schuyler St, Belmont, New York (1890, NRHP 2001)
- Oil City City Hall, 248 Seneca St, Oil City, Pennsylvania (1890, demolished)
- Reuting Block, 122 W Spring St, Titusville, Pennsylvania (1890)
- Fredonia Village Hall and Opera House, 9 Church St, Fredonia, New York (1891)
- Joseph Seep house, 304 W Main St, Titusville, Pennsylvania (1891, demolished)
- Grace United Methodist Church, 100 Central Ave, Oil City, Pennsylvania (1892–95)
- Oil City Hospital, 174 E Bissell Ave, Oil City, Pennsylvania (1893–94, demolished)
- Bradford Old City Hall, (Note: A contributing property to the Bradford Downtown Historic District, NRHP-listed in 2000.) 23 Kennedy St, Bradford, Pennsylvania (1897 and 1902, NRHP 1976)
- Ahira Hall Memorial Library, 37 W Main St, Brocton, New York (1903–05)
