= National Transit Building =

- U.S. National Register of Historic Places
- U.S. Historic district – Contributing property
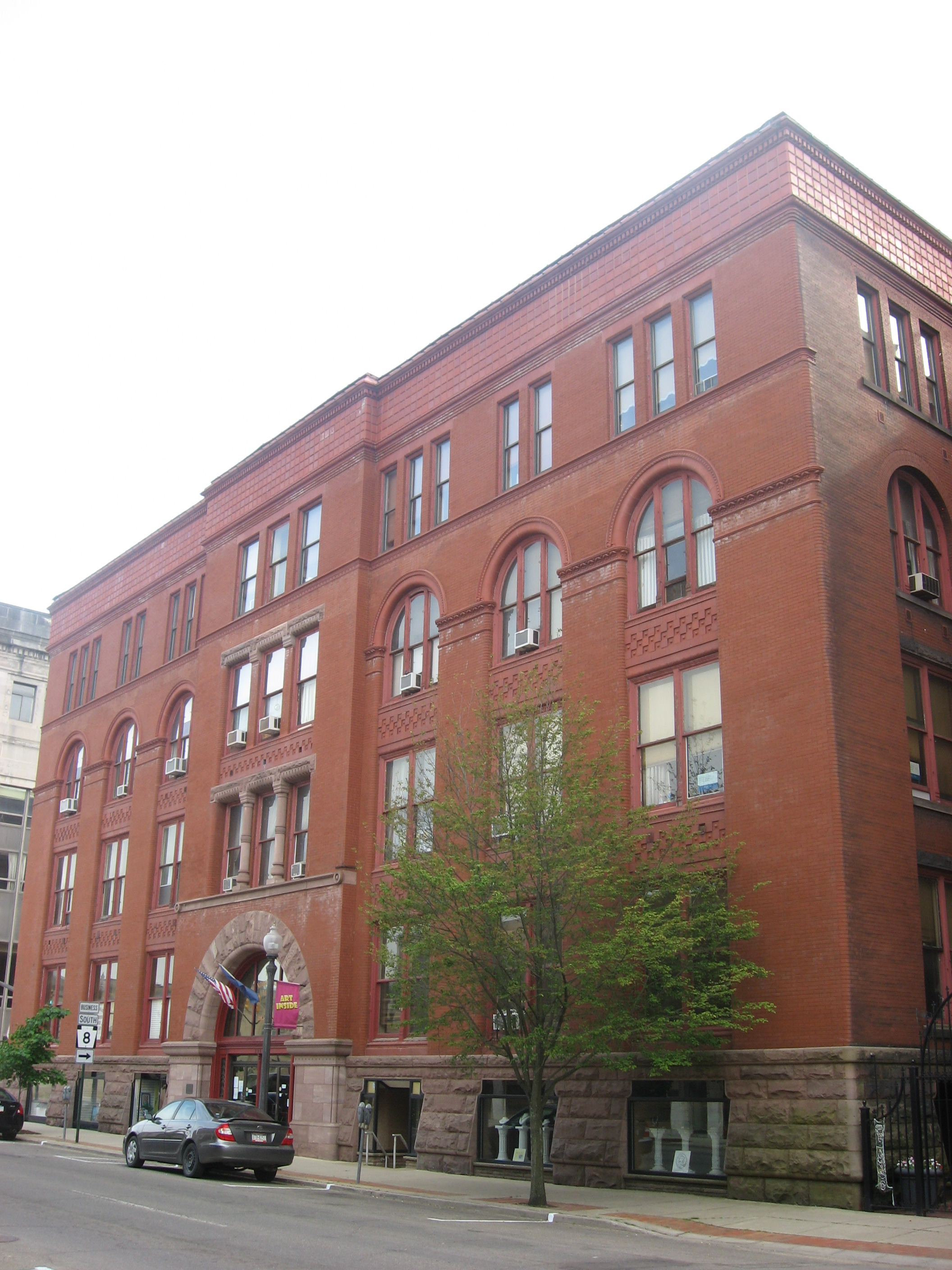
- View from Seneca Street

- Location within Pennsylvania Location within the United States
- Location: 206 Seneca St., Oil City, Pennsylvania
- Coordinates: 41°26′6″N 79°42′32″W
- Area: 0.5 acres (0.20 ha)
- Built: 1890, 1896
- Built by: Horace B. Robinson
- Architect: Curtis & Archer
- Architectural style: Chicago
- NRHP reference No.: 78002477
- Added to NRHP: September 13, 1978

The National Transit Building is an historic commercial building that is located at 206 Seneca Street, Oil City, Venango County, Pennsylvania, United States.

It was listed on the National Register of Historic Places in 1978, and is part of the Oil City Downtown Commercial Historic District.

== History and architectural features ==
The main block was built in 1890, and is a four-story, stone and brick building. An adjacent annex building was built in 1896. The annex is connected by an enclosed bridgeway at the second, third, and fourth levels. The main entrance features a sandstone archway.

Part of the Oil City Downtown Commercial Historic District, which was once the hub of John D. Rockefeller’s Standard Oil Company, it has been transformed by the Oil City Civic Center into artists’ studios. Architects of the building were Curtis & Archer of Fredonia, New York. The builder of the structure, Horace B. Robinson of Oil City, etched his initials into a window on the second floor of the building with his diamond ring. At a cost of $90,000.00, it was the first building in the nation with offices for companies specializing in the transportation of oil by pipeline.

Located at Center and Seneca Streets, the red brick structure opened in 1890, followed six years later by the yellow brick Annex. The two structures were connected by an architectural “bridge” for a total of 25,880 square feet. The foundation of the building was constructed from cut stone taken from the Humboldt Refining Company near Plumer. The round corners of the original building were achieved by using curved bricks, with decorative bricks providing various patterns in other areas of the building. Between the main building and the Annex is the beautiful wrought iron, spiral fire escape.

Great attention to detail was paid in the construction of The National Transit Building. The main entrance floors are marble. Wall paneling is solid oak. The banisters and newel posts are wrought iron with ornate brass and bronze appliques. American Civil War cannonballs were fashioned into doorknobs. Another impressive site is the water-powered elevator in the Annex. It is modeled after an elevator built in the Eiffel Tower in Paris. The elevator was operable until this type of elevator was banned by the state, although the intricate mechanism is still visible.

In 1978 The National Transit Building was placed on the National Register of Historic Places. After several owner transitions, the building was purchased by Ralph Nader’s organization and later donated to the Oil City Civic Center. In 2005 a wrap-around lobby mural, printed on vinyl, was dedicated. At a cost of $33,000.00, the mural is based on historical research and focuses on the crude oil and natural gas exploration of this region.

According to a National Transit tenant, who was involved in the development of the arts:

"It has an amazing history – at the turn of the last century, as the national headquarters for the oil industry under John D. Rockefeller and more recently, as the focus of a growing arts movement in Oil City. This magnificent historic building went through some hard times in the late 1980s and 1990s. At one point there were plans to tear it down and put up a CVS! Ralph Nader heard about it, bought the building and several years later turned it over to a non-profit corporation founded to manage it, the Oil City Civic Center. It has been restored chiefly through the efforts of volunteers."

Today it is the hub of Oil City's arts revitalization and it offers work and teaching spaces for visual artists, musicians, dancers, two galleries and a performance space. The Oil City Civic Center, Inc. is charged with preserving the historic complex and to provide affordable space for nonprofit organizations.

In 2016, the building hosted the inaugural Oil Valley Film Festival.
