= Oil City North Side Historic District =

Historic district in Pennsylvania, United States

- U.S. National Register of Historic Places
- U.S. Historic district
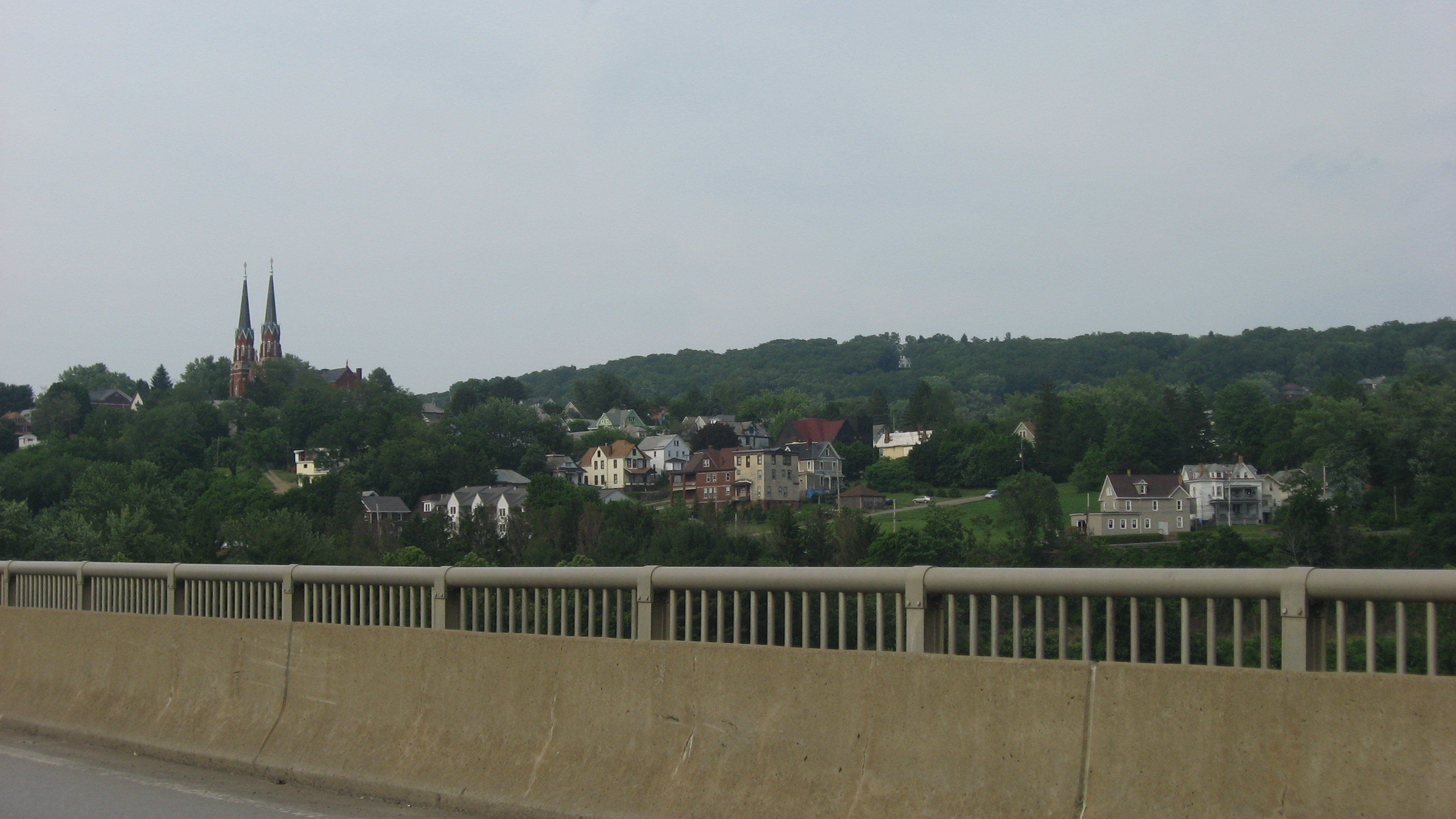
- View from Veterans Memorial Bridge

- Location within Pennsylvania Location within the United States
- Location: Roughly bounded by Conrail RR, Manning St., Park Rd., Deer St., and Linden, Hasson, Bishop, Carroll and E. Bissell Ave., Oil City, Pennsylvania
- Coordinates: 41°26′06″N 79°42′45″W
- Area: 250 acres (100 ha)
- Built: 1870
- Architectural style: Late Victorian, Late 19th And 20th Century Revivals
- MPS: Oil Industry Resources in Western Pennsylvania MPS
- NRHP reference No.: 99001335
- Added to NRHP: November 12, 1999

The Oil City North Side Historic District, also known as Cottage Hill, Palace Hill, and Polish Hill, is a national historic district that is located in Oil City, Venango County, Pennsylvania.

Situated directly north of the Oil City Downtown Commercial Historic District, it was added to the National Register of Historic Places in 1999.

== History and architectural features ==
This district includes 1,140 contributing buildings that are located in a predominantly residential section of Oil City. It includes a few neighborhood commercial buildings, churches, and two schools. The houses were built between about 1870 and 1945 and were designed in a variety of popular architectural styles, including Romanesque Revival, Queen Anne, Second Empire, Colonial Revival, Classical Revival, and Italianate.

This district also includes a number of working class, vernacular dwellings, especially in the Polish Hill section.
