= Wolf's Head =

Wolf's Head may refer to:

- Wolf's Head Society, founded at Yale University in 1883
- Wolfs Head, a mountain in Wyoming's Wind River Range
- Wolf's Head (motor oil), company founded in 1879

== See also ==
- Caput lupinum, meaning "wolf's head" in Latin
- Wolf
- Wolfshead: The Legend of Robin Hood
- Wolfshead
