= Pennsylvania House of Representatives, District 64 =

American legislative district

Pennsylvania's 64th State House of Representatives district
Representative
R. Lee James; R

The 64th Pennsylvania House of Representatives District is located in northwest Pennsylvania and has been represented by R. Lee James since 2013.

== District Profile ==
The 64th District encompasses all of Venango County and the following parts of Crawford County:

- Hydetown
- Oil Creek Township
- Rome Township
- Steuben Township
- Titusville
- Townville
- Troy Township

== Representatives ==
Representative	Party	Years	District home	Note
Prior to 1969, seats were apportioned by county.
Alvin Kahle	Republican	1969 – 1974		
Joseph Levi, II	Republican	1975 – 1984		
Ronald E. Black	Republican	1985 – 1992		
Scott Hutchinson	Republican	1993 – 2012	Oil City	
R. Lee James	Republican	2013 – present		Incumbent

== Recent election results ==
PA House election, 2024: Pennsylvania House, District 64
Party	Candidate	Votes	%
Republican	R. Lee James (incumbent)	25,456	86.97
Constitution	Ron Johnson	3,814	13.03
Total votes		29,270	100.00
Republican hold			

PA House election, 2022: Pennsylvania House, District 64
Party	Candidate	Votes	%
Republican	R. Lee James (incumbent)	Unopposed	
Total votes		20,286	100.00
Republican hold			

PA House election, 2020: Pennsylvania House, District 64
Party	Candidate	Votes	%
Republican	R. Lee James (incumbent)	23,004	80.46
Green	Michael Bagdes-Canning	5,587	19.54
Total votes		28,591	100.00
Republican hold			

PA House election, 2018: Pennsylvania House, District 64
Party	Candidate	Votes	%
Republican	R. Lee James (incumbent)	13,839	67.54
Democratic	John Kluck	6,652	32.46
Total votes		20,491	100.00
Republican hold			

PA House election, 2016: Pennsylvania House, District 64
Party	Candidate	Votes	%
Republican	R. Lee James (incumbent)	16,082	62.48
Democratic	John Kluck	8,987	34.91
Green	Michael Bagdes-Canning	672	2.61
Total votes		25,741	100.00
Republican hold			
