= Scott Hutchinson =

American politician

Scott E. Hutchinson

Member of the Pennsylvania Senate from the 21st district
- Incumbent
- Assumed office January 1, 2013
- Preceded by: Mary Jo White

Member of the Pennsylvania House of Representatives from the 64th district
- In office January 5, 1993 – November 30, 2012
- Preceded by: Ronald E. Black
- Succeeded by: Lee James

Personal details
- Born: August 19, 1961 (age 65) Oil City, Pennsylvania
- Party: Republican
- Spouse: Mary Beth Hutchinson
- Children: Sophie Hutchinson, Anne Marie Hutchinson, Lucy Hutchinson
- Education: University of Pennsylvania
- Website: Senator Scott Hutchinson

Scott E. Hutchinson (born August 19, 1961) is an American politician from Pennsylvania currently serving as a Republican member of the Pennsylvania State Senate for the 21st district since 2013. He also served as a member of the Pennsylvania House of Representatives for the 64th District from 1992 to 2013.

== Early life and education ==
Hutchinson graduated from Oil City Area High School and received a bachelor's degree in economics from The Wharton School of the University of Pennsylvania in 1983. He has also studied at the University of Pittsburgh at Titusville and Thiel College.

== Career ==
Hutchinson served as the chief deputy county treasurer for Venango County from 1984 to 1992. In addition, he was a member of the Oil City Area School Board from 1986–1992. He was also a member of the Venango County Board of Assistance until 1992.

He served as a member of the Pennsylvania House of Representatives for the 64th district from 1993 to 2012.

He was Republican chairman of the House Environmental Resources and Energy Committee and a member of the House Veterans Affairs and Emergency Preparedness Committee.

He was elected in an uncontested election to the Pennsylvania Senate to represent the 21st district. He succeeded Republican Mary Jo White, who retired at the end of her term in 2012.

For the 2025-2026 Session Hutchinson serves on the following committees in the State Senate:

- Finance (Chair)
- Environmental Resources & Energy (Vice Chair)
- Game & Fisheries
- Health & Human Services
- Local Government

== Personal ==
He married Mary Beth Radkowski in 1993 and together they have three children (Sophie, Anne Marie, and Lucy) and live in Oil City.
