= Robert Lee James =

American politician

Lee James

Member of the Pennsylvania House of Representatives from the 64th district
- Incumbent
- Assumed office January 1, 2013
- Preceded by: Scott Hutchinson

Personal details
- Born: Robert Lee James; November 20, 1948 (age 77)
- Party: Republican
- Education: Clarion University
- Occupation: investment manager

Robert Lee James (born November 20, 1948) is a Republican member of the Pennsylvania House of Representatives. He has represented the 64th District since 2013.

James graduated from Oil City High School. He then served for six years as an active duty member of the United States Navy. After his discharge, he enrolled in Clarion University, earning a bachelor's degree. He worked in commercial banking for a decade before returning to Clarion to receive a master's in business administration. James later worked as an investment manager.

== Career ==
James currently sits on the Appropriations, Environmental Resources & Energy, Local Government, Tourism & Recreational Development committees.
