= Oil City South Side Historic District =

Historic district in Pennsylvania, United States

- U.S. National Register of Historic Places
- U.S. Historic district
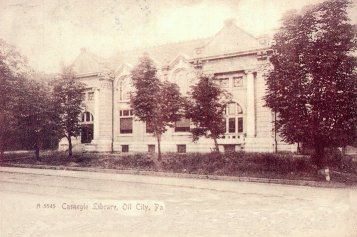
- Postcard of the Carnegie library

- Location within Pennsylvania Location within the United States
- Location: Roughly bounded by Allegheny R., Wilson Ave., Lee's Ln., W. Third, and W. Fifth Sts., and Reservoir St., Oil City, Pennsylvania
- Coordinates: 41°25′18″N 79°43′12″W
- Area: 222 acres (90 ha)
- Built: 1863
- Architect: Bailey, Emmett E.; Brenot, Joseph P.
- Architectural style: Various
- MPS: Oil Industry Resources in Western Pennsylvania MPS
- NRHP reference No.: 97001249
- Added to NRHP: November 10, 1997

The Oil City South Side Historic District, also known as Venango City and Laytonia, is a national historic district that is located in Oil City, Venango County, Pennsylvania, and is situated directly south of the Oil City Downtown Commercial Historic District.

It was added to the National Register of Historic Places in 1997.

== History and architectural features ==
This district encompasses 882 contributing buildings and two contributing objects that are located in a mixed-use section of Oil City. It includes a large number of dwellings, commercial buildings, churches, and institutional buildings. The houses were built roughly between 1863 and 1945 and were designed in a variety of popular architectural styles, including Romanesque Revival, Late Gothic Revival, Second Empire, Colonial Revival, Classical Revival, Bungalow, American Foursquare, and Italianate.

Notable non-residential buildings include the Carnegie Library (1905), the Latonia Theater (1928), the Knights of Columbus Hall (1927-1928), the Good Hope Lutheran Church Rectory (1928), Christ Episcopal Church (1886), St. Stephen's Roman Catholic Church (1906), and Second Lutheran Church (1913). Located in the district is the separately listed Oil City Armory.

It was added to the National Register of Historic Places in 1997.
