= Joseph Levi =

American politician (1924–2019)

Joseph Levi II

Member of the Pennsylvania House of Representatives from the 64th district
- In office 1975–1984
- Preceded by: Alvin Kahle
- Succeeded by: Ronald Black

Personal details
- Born: January 31, 1924 Oil City, Pennsylvania
- Died: March 31, 2019 (aged 95) Surfside Beach, South Carolina
- Party: Republican

Joseph Levi II (January 31, 1924 – March 31, 2019) was a Republican member of the Pennsylvania House of Representatives.

== Biography ==
Levi was born in Oil City, Pennsylvania and graduated from Oil City High School. He served in the United States Navy. Levi received his bachelor's degree from Bucknell University. He served on the Oil City Council from 1961 to 1965. Levi also served on the Venango County Commission in 1965. Levi was an oil producer and served as President of Northwest Pennsylvania Regional and Planning Committee in 1973 and 1974.
