= Fredonia Opera House =

Coordinates: 42.4409°N 79.3323°W

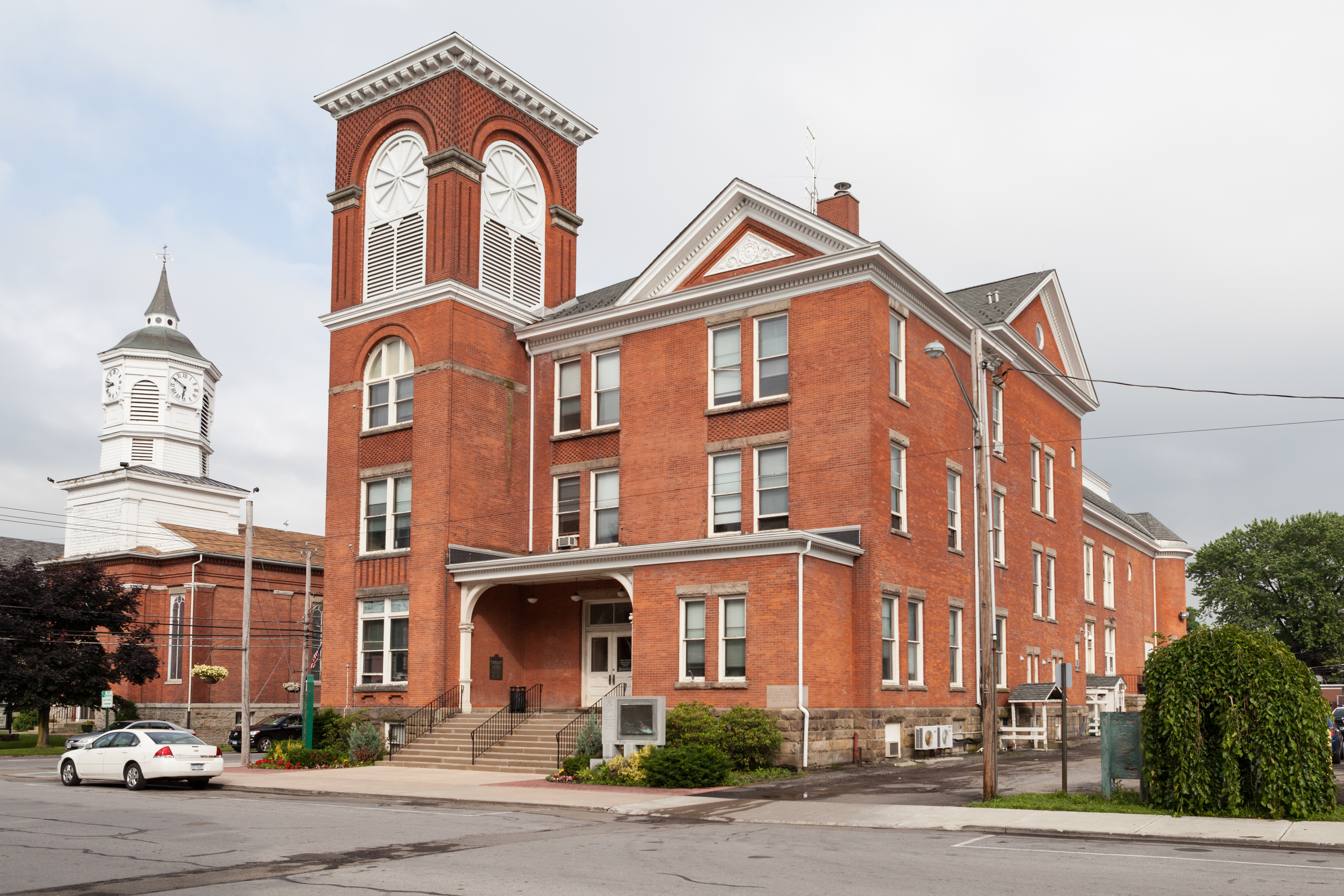
Fredonia Village Hall and Opera House, July 2015

The 1891 Fredonia Opera House is located in the Village Hall, in downtown Fredonia, New York, at 9-11 Church St. Currently a year-round performing arts center, it stages live performances and a cinema series of first-run independent and foreign films, and is a rental venue for community meetings, debates, weddings, and performances.

== Building design ==
The architect of the Village Hall was Enoch A. Curtis. Well known in this region, he used what has been termed "Queen Anne eclectic style" for the exterior of the structure and for the interior office spaces. In the Opera House, however, he allowed himself freer rein. Elements of major classical theaters in Europe and New York were freely adapted and, with the aid of then-new technology, produced with relatively inexpensive and readily available materials. The graceful curve of the horseshoe balcony, the wood-turning decorating the boxes and the front of the balcony, and the large, ornate, pressed-metal proscenium were all echoes of world-renowned theaters. These elements are all still present in the restored theater. The hall originally had a frescoed plaster ceiling, but that succumbed to water damage and was replaced in 1903 by the current tin ceiling, also now refurbished. Remodeling occurred several times. During the first decade of this century the original gas lighting was gradually replaced by electric.

In 1926 the original folding wooden chairs were replaced by larger Heywood-Wakefield seats, many of which are still in place. New stairs to the balcony were installed, as was the current projection booth. New motion picture equipment was added and some time later the house windows, now revealed, were plastered over. There were, however, long periods of neglect, and by 1981 the Opera House had deteriorated so badly that it had to be closed.

== Grand opening ==
The opening of the Opera House in April 1891 was a gala affair at which guests from throughout the region could watch a performance of Josephine, Empress of the French. The evening also was the realization of a dream for Village officials whose plans for an imposing municipal building overlooking Barker Commons (the Village Square) had, from the beginning, included an Opera House. This was a dream shared by many late 19th-century communities where it was felt that, with the coming of the railroads, their relatively isolated citizens could now have access to performing arts and other events formerly available only in major cities.

Fredonia's Opera House was a large and elegant community theater, able to support a wide range of activities. Attracted by the venue's acoustics, many late 19th and early 20th century entertainers performed and brought troupes here. Notable performers included Clara Morris, James O'Neill and Pat Rooney. With a blend of professional and local talent, there were minstrel shows and light opera and dramatic offerings including Hamlet, Mrs. Wiggs of the Cabbage Patch, Ten Nights in a Barroom and Uncle Tom's Cabin. There were musical recitals and political oratory, graduations and religious services, and demonstrations of wrestling and cooking. Elderly Fredonians recall participating in talent shows featuring tap dancing and singing. From the first decade of the 20th century on, however, there was an increasing presence of motion pictures and, after 1926, while live performances continued, movies dominated.

== Restoration ==
In 1983 a plan to demolish the building engendered public outcry. The Fredonia Preservation Society came into existence in response to this threatened demolition and lobbied for the building's rehabilitation.

In 1985 Village Trustees, in a reprise of the financial technique used to construct the building, decided to float a bond to renovate its administrative portions, and that decision was overwhelmingly supported in a public referendum. At that time, the Society committed itself to raising funds to rehabilitate the Opera House. Funding was accomplished by a locally conducted capital construction campaign, an Environmental Quality Bond Act grant through the New York State Office of Parks, Recreation and Historic Preservation, several smaller state grants, help from the Gebbie Foundation and from the Village itself. Throughout, significant amounts of volunteer contributions of labor and material helped. Approximately $900,000 was raised, and after a nearly ten-year restoration process, the Opera House is now open and for another century of public service as a multi-purpose community cultural center.
