= Ronald Black =

American politician

Ronald E. Black

Member of the Pennsylvania House of Representatives from the 64th district
- In office 1985–1992
- Preceded by: Joseph Levi
- Succeeded by: Scott Hutchinson

Personal details
- Born: September 23, 1935 (age 90) Oil City, Pennsylvania
- Party: Republican

Ronald E. Black (born September 23, 1935) is a former Republican member of the Pennsylvania House of Representatives.
