= Alvin Kahle =

American politician

Member of the Pennsylvania House of Representatives from the 64th district
- In office 1969–1974
- Preceded by: District created
- Succeeded by: Joseph Levi

Member of the Pennsylvania House of Representatives from the Venango County district
- In office 1965–1968

Personal details
- Born: November 7, 1909 Clarion County, Pennsylvania
- Died: October 27, 1986 (aged 76) Emlenton, Pennsylvania
- Party: Republican

Alvin Kahle (November 7, 1909 – October 27, 1986) was a Republican member of the Pennsylvania House of Representatives.
