= Benchmark International Arena =

Multiuse arena in Tampa, Florida, US

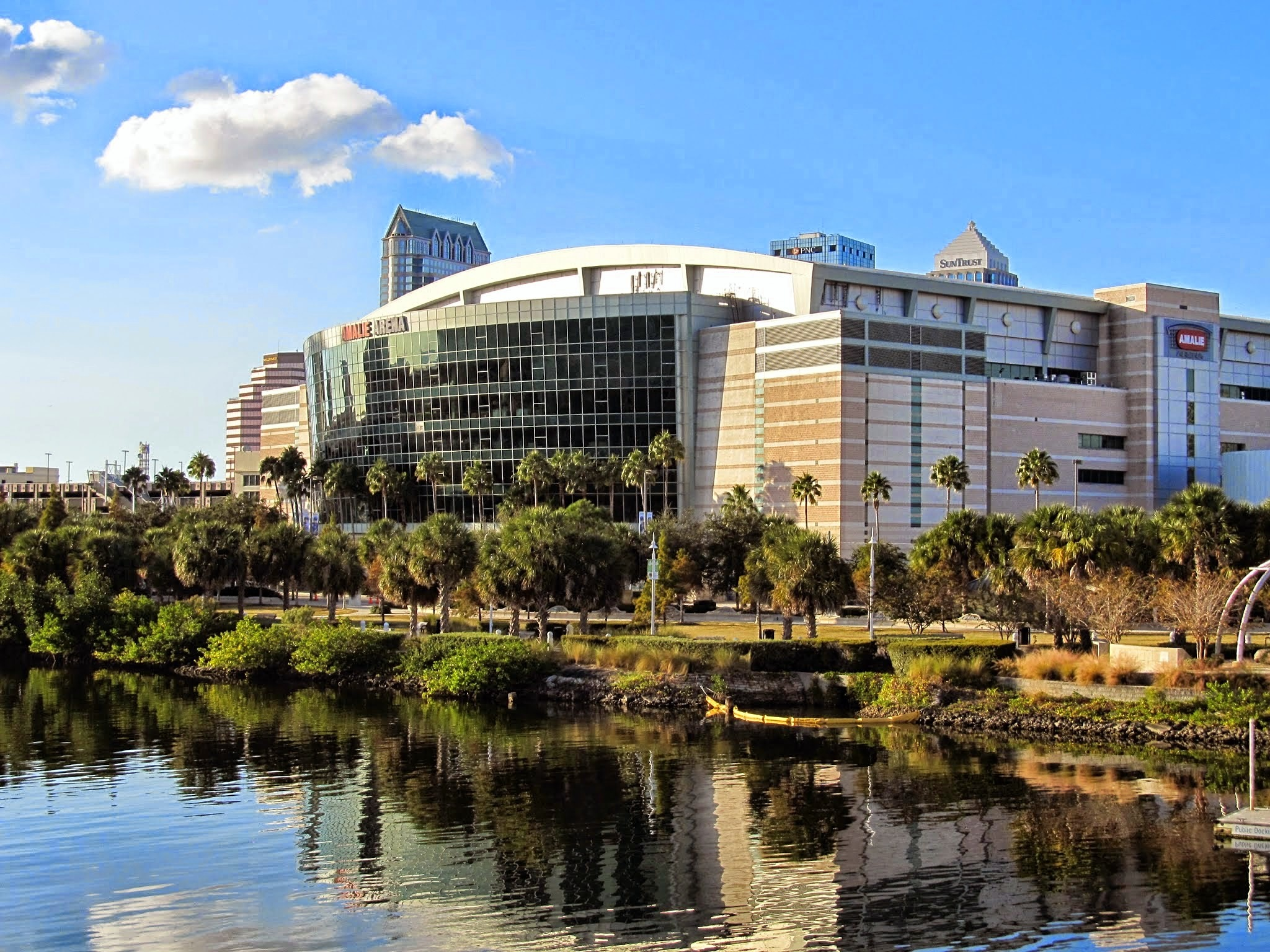
- Benchmark International Arena, then Amalie Arena, in November 2016

- Location in Florida Location in the United States
- Former names: Ice Palace (1996–2002); St. Pete Times Forum (2002–2012); Tampa Bay Times Forum (2012–2014); Amalie Arena (2014–2025)
- Address: 401 Channelside Drive
- Location: Tampa, Florida, U.S.
- Coordinates: 27°56′34″N 82°27′7″W
- Owner: Hillsborough County, Florida
- Operator: Tampa Bay Entertainment Properties, LLC, a division of Vinik Sports Group, LLC
- Capacity: Arena football: 18,500; Basketball: 20,500; Concerts: 21,500; Ice hockey: 19,092
- Public transit: TECO Streetcar at Benchmark International Arena

Construction
- Groundbreaking: April 14, 1994
- Opened: October 20, 1996
- Cost: $139 million; ($302 million in 2025 dollars)
- Architect: Ellerbe Becket
- Structural engineer: Walter P Moore
- General contractor: Hunt/Morse Diesel

Tenants
- Tampa Bay Lightning (NHL) (1996–present); Tampa Bay Storm (AFL) (1997–2017); Tampa Breeze (LFL) (2009–2012); Toronto Raptors (NBA) (2020–2021)

Website
- benchmarkintlarena.com

Benchmark International Arena is a multipurpose arena in Tampa, Florida, United States, that has been used for ice hockey, basketball, arena football, concerts, and other events. It is mainly used as the home for the Tampa Bay Lightning of the National Hockey League.

The building opened in 1996 and was originally known as the Ice Palace. In August 2002, the building's naming rights were sold to the St. Petersburg Times, which became the Tampa Bay Times in January 2012; accordingly, the arena was known as the St. Pete Times Forum (2002–2012) and Tampa Bay Times Forum (2012–2014). The arena was renamed Amalie Arena in September 2014, when the naming rights were transferred to Amalie Oil Company. On August 13, 2025, it was announced that the facility's name was changed to Benchmark International Arena.

== History ==
Tampa Bay Times Forum logo (2012–2014)

Amalie Arena logo (2014–2025)

The venue, located in Downtown Tampa's Channelside District, was a secondary location chosen after the failure of Tampa Coliseum Inc. to secure funding to construct an arena on Tampa Sports Authority land near Tampa Stadium. The city of Tampa paid $86 million and the Tampa Bay Lightning paid $53 million for the venue's construction and infrastructure. It opened in 1996 as the Ice Palace. Its first event was a performance by the Royal Hanneford Circus. The first hockey game was the Lightning hosting the New York Rangers, which the Lightning won 5–2.

The arena, built as a new home for the Lightning, was necessary because of the lack of a major league-sized arena in the Tampa Bay Area. The largest existing arenas in the region that were best shaped for hockey were Bayfront Arena in St. Petersburg, the Expo Hall at the Florida State Fairgrounds in Tampa, and the USF Sun Dome on the campus of the University of South Florida in Tampa. However, all of these were either too small for an NHL team to use long term, as their capacities were only 5,800 for Bayfront Arena and 10,425 for the Expo Hall, or would need to undergo extensive renovations to make space for hockey in the case of the Sun Dome (which after renovations would then only have an estimated capacity in the mid-7,000s for hockey, making it too small as well). Prior to the opening of the Ice Palace, the Lightning spent one season at the Expo Hall, and then moved to the Florida Suncoast Dome, which was renamed the "Thunderdome", in St. Petersburg in 1993. The Thunderdome, now Tropicana Field, is currently home to Major League Baseball's Tampa Bay Rays.

The arena is owned by Hillsborough County and leased to the Tampa Sports Authority. The authority leases the arena back to the Lightning, who operate it. The current lease agreement ties the arena to the Lightning ownership.

Naming rights to the arena were sold to the then St. Petersburg Times, the largest local newspaper in the Tampa Bay area. Other entertainment events occasionally held in the Forum include concerts, NBA exhibition games, USF basketball and NCAA men's and women's basketball tournament games, NCAA Frozen Four games, tennis, professional wrestling, boxing, figure skating, and rodeos (as well as stand-alone bull riding events; the Forum has hosted an event by the PBR's premier tour, the Built Ford Tough Series, annually since 1998).

In 2010, the Tampa Bay Times Forum was ranked as the fourth busiest arena in the United States.

A $35 million renovation was scheduled to be completed before the 2012 Republican National Convention. The renovation included a rebuilt grand plaza entrance, elimination of 2 lower-level suites in each corner (8 of current 28 suites) leaving views from the concourse area to the playing area, renovation of each suite, elimination of sections 323 and 324 on the terrace level (574 seats) for a bar and stage area that will feature a new digital theatre organ, more concessions areas on the terrace level, an 11,000-square-foot (1,000 m^{2}) outdoor deck and party area overlooking outside plaza and facing the downtown skyline, new climate controls that improve both the ice surface and spectator comfort, new lighting, all new padded seats, resurfaced and redecorated concourse, combining Icons and Medallions restaurants into one venue, and updated restrooms.

Also in 2012, the Tampa Bay Times Forum installed a new video display board. The board is billed as the largest of its kind in North America. Its two larger faces measure 28 × 50 feet (8.5 × 15.2 m), while its two smaller faces are 28 × 20 feet (8.5 × 6.1 m). In comparison, the arena's old display board measured 16 × 28 feet (4.9 × 8.5 m) on all sides.

On September 3, 2014, Lightning owner Jeff Vinik announced the renaming of the Forum to Amalie Arena after coming to an agreement with Amalie Oil Company, a motor oil company based in Tampa.

On August 13, 2025, it was announced that Tampa-based mergers and acquisitions firm Benchmark International bought the naming rights to the arena.

== Events ==
=== NHL ===
As home of the Tampa Bay Lightning, Benchmark International Arena has hosted games in the Stanley Cup Final, hosting games one, two, five, and seven of the 2004 Stanley Cup Final, where the Lightning defeated the Calgary Flames four games to three to win their first Stanley Cup. During the 2015 Stanley Cup Final against the Chicago Blackhawks, the arena was the site of games one, two, and five. Amalie Arena was also the site of games one, two, and five of the 2021 Stanley Cup Final, where the Lightning defeated the Montreal Canadiens four games to one to win their third Stanley Cup.

In the 2004 and 2021 Finals, the Lightning clinched the Stanley Cup on home ice at Benchmark International Arena. Games three, four and six of the 2022 Stanley Cup Final were also held at Benchmark International Arena; the Colorado Avalanche became the first visiting team to hoist the Stanley Cup at the arena after defeating the Lightning four games to two. It did not host the 2020 Stanley Cup Final as all games were held behind closed doors at Edmonton's Rogers Place due to the COVID-19 pandemic. However, the eventual champion Lightning (who defeated the Dallas Stars in six games) did hold watch parties outside the arena for select season ticket holders. In addition, Benchmark International Arena has hosted the National Hockey League All-Star Game twice, in 1999 and in 2018.

=== PWHL ===
On January 31, 2027, the Professional Women's Hockey League played its first game in Tampa and at Benchmark International Arena between the Montreal Victoire and New York Sirens.

=== College basketball ===
In college basketball, the arena is a regular host for games in both the NCAA Division I men's basketball tournament and NCAA Division I women's basketball tournament. The arena has hosted first and second-round games for the men's tournament in 2003, 2008, 2011, and 2026 (it was scheduled to host games again in 2020, only to have the tournament cancelled due to the COVID-19 pandemic). In the women's tournament, Amalie Arena has hosted the Final Four of the 2008, 2015, 2019, and 2025 tournaments. The arena has also hosted conference tournaments, hosting the 2007 ACC men's basketball tournament and the 2009 and 2022 SEC Men's Basketball Tournaments. The arena was also the main home of the South Florida Bulls men's basketball team for their 2011–12 season while the USF Sun Dome underwent extensive renovations.

=== AFL ===
During the arena's time as home of the Tampa Bay Storm of the Arena Football League, it hosted the league's championship game, known as the ArenaBowl, on two occasions, ArenaBowl XII in 1998 and ArenaBowl XVII in 2003.

=== Volleyball ===
Amalie Arena hosted the NCAA Division I women's volleyball tournament Final Four in the 2009 and 2023 tournaments.

=== NBA ===
The arena was slated to host an NBA preseason game in 2010 between the Orlando Magic and Miami Heat, the league's two Florida teams. However, months before the game, the arena's basketball floor was treated with an oil-based cleaning solution that resulted in a slippery film forming on it. According to Magic players, the floor was so slippery that they had to walk through their shootaround. When it became apparent that there was no way to make the court playable, the game was canceled half an hour before the scheduled tipoff. All fans received a full refund.

For the 2020–21 NBA season, the Toronto Raptors played their home games in Amalie Arena due to travel restrictions imposed by the Canadian government in response to the COVID-19 pandemic in Canada.

=== College hockey ===
The Frozen Four of the 2012 NCAA Division I Men's Ice Hockey Tournament was held in the arena, hosted by the University of Alabama in Huntsville, the nearest collegiate hockey team to Florida. This was the first time the Frozen Four was held outside the northern US since 1999, when the University of Alaska Anchorage hosted the event at the Arrowhead Pond of Anaheim in Anaheim, California. Boston College won the national championship game 4–1 against Ferris State. The arena again hosted the Frozen Four in 2016 and 2023.

=== Combat sports ===
The arena held its first UFC event on April 16, 2016, for UFC on Fox: Teixeira vs. Evans. The UFC returned to the arena for UFC Fight Night: Joanna vs. Waterson on October 12, 2019. The UFC returned again for UFC on ESPN: Covington vs. Buckley on December 14, 2024.

On December 18, 2021, Amalie Arena hosted the Jake Paul vs. Tyron Woodley II boxing pay-per-view event. Paul won via knockout in round 6. On July 20, 2024, the arena hosted the Jake Paul vs. Mike Perry boxing event on pay-per-view. Paul won via knockout in round 6.

It has also held the World Wrestling Federation (now renamed to WWE) pay-per-view event Survivor Series (2000), as well as Extreme Rules (2011), Battleground (2014), and will host Backlash (2026). Tampa hosted WrestleMania 37 in 2021 but the arena was not involved in the festivities surrounding the event, as all weekly WWE events took place in a bio-secure bubble with zero ticketed fans in attendance called the WWE ThunderDome at the time due to the COVID-19 pandemic. WrestleMania 37 itself was held at Raymond James Stadium in front of a reduced capacity audience over the course of two nights.

=== Other events ===
British alternative rock band Coldplay performed a concert at the venue on June 28, 2012, as part of their Mylo Xyloto Tour.

Marvel Universe Live! kicked off its national tour from the venue on July 10, 2014.

The arena hosted AMSOIL Arenacross from 2015 to 2017. The arena hosted the Kellogg's Tour of Gymnastics Champions in 2016.

== Gallery ==
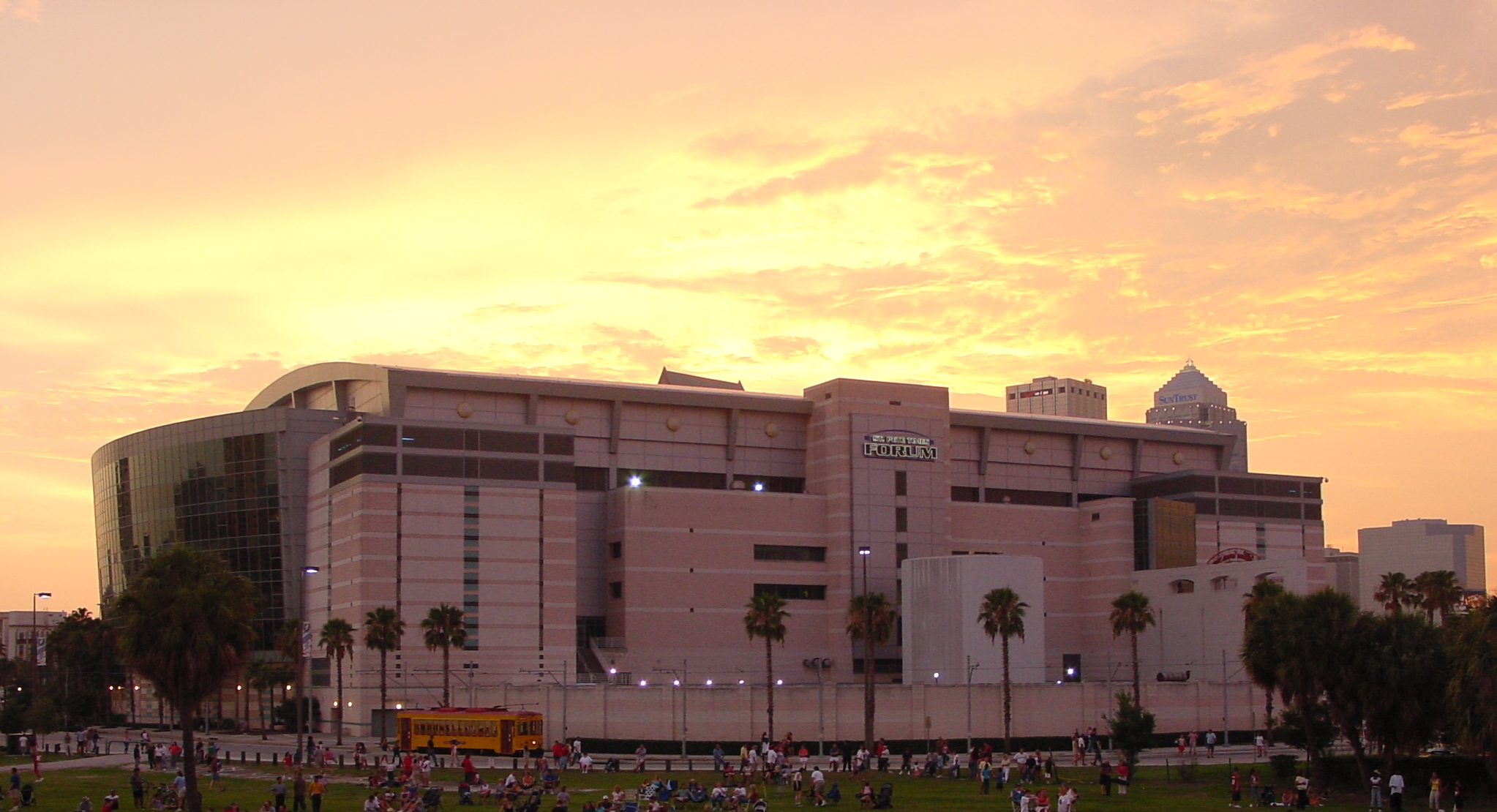
St. Pete Times Forum in 2004

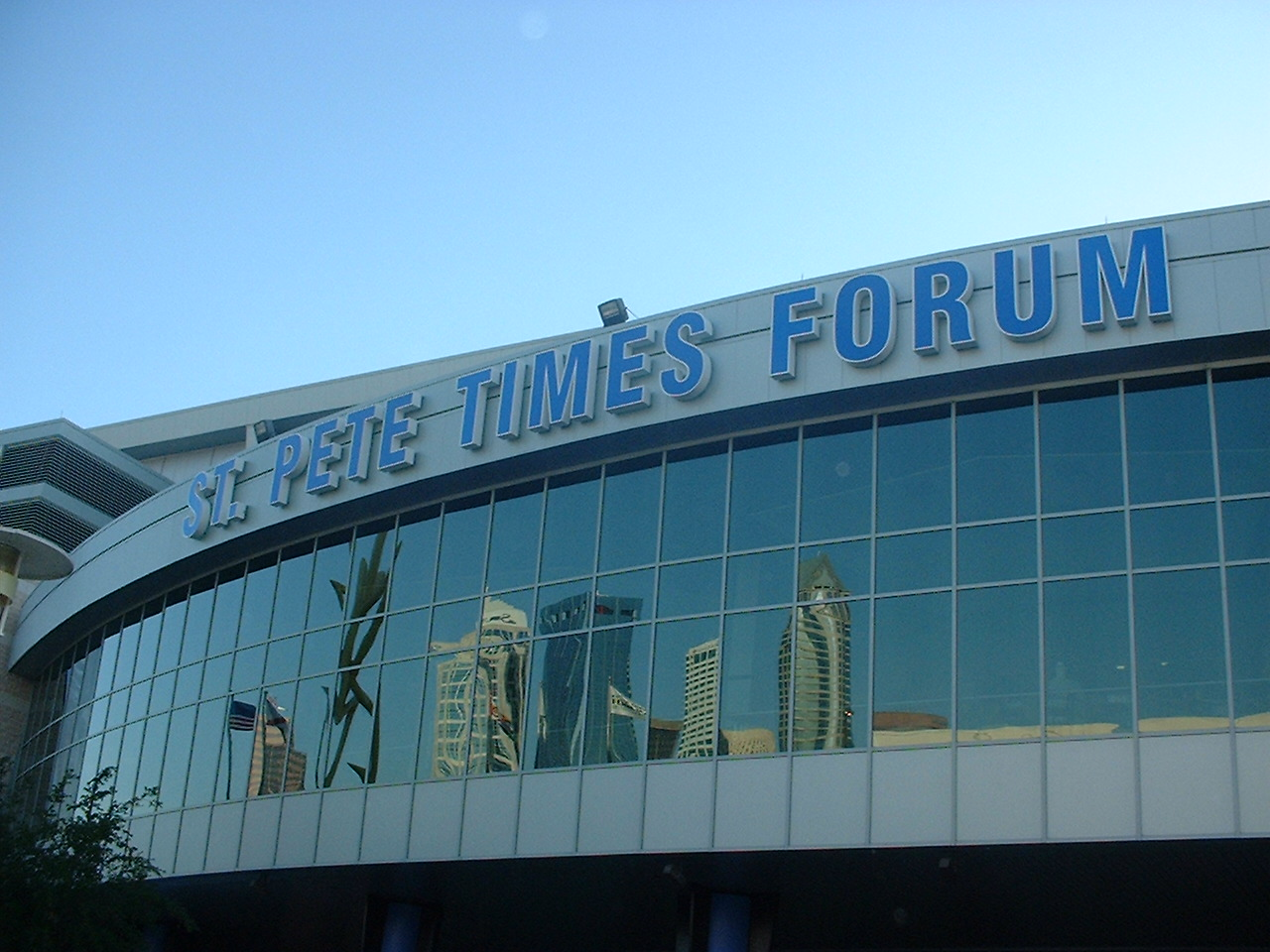
Exterior view in 2005 with old St. Pete Times Forum signage.

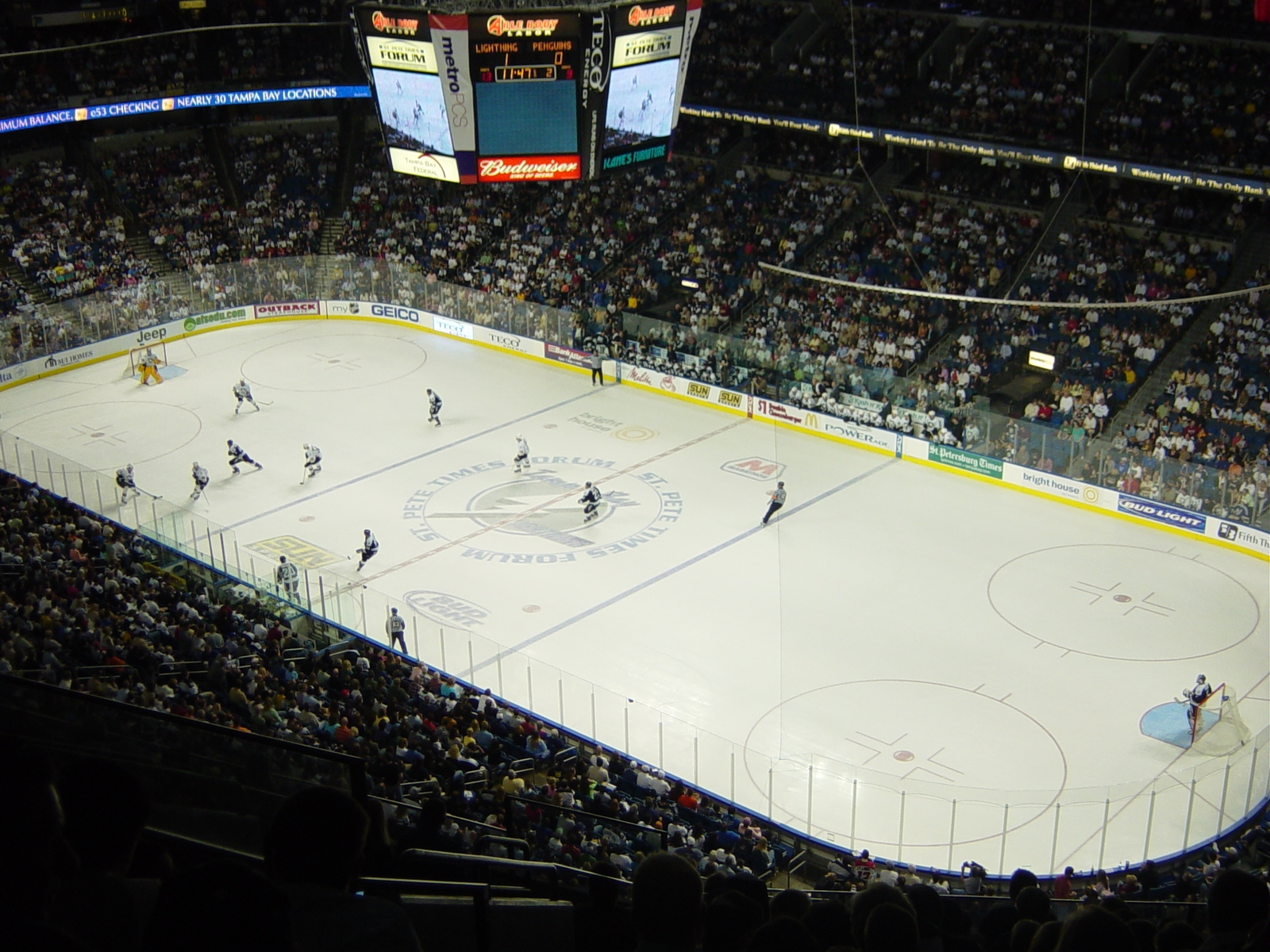
Inside the St Pete Times Forum, April 8, 2006.

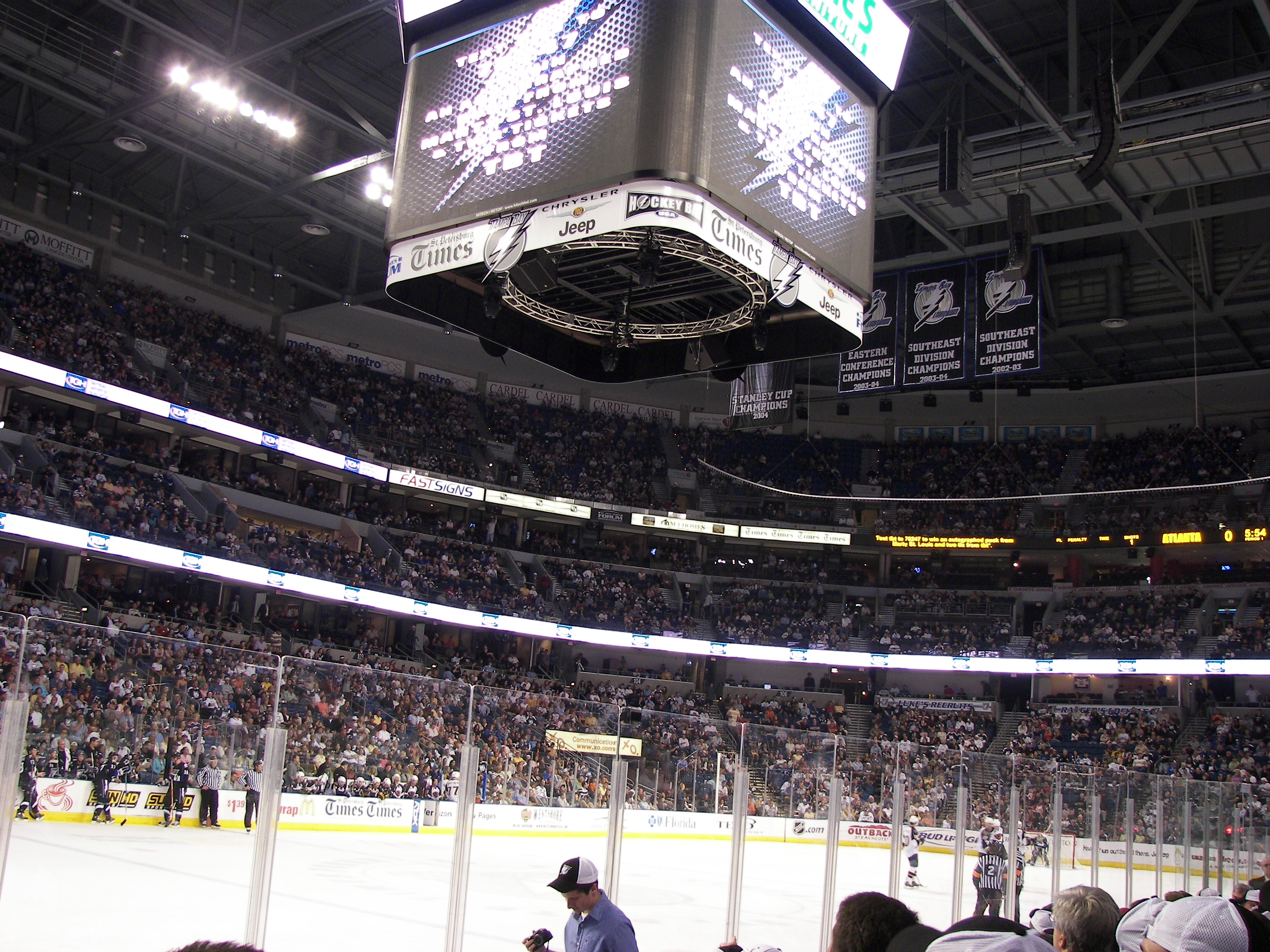
St Pete Times Forum interior from near ice level in 2007.

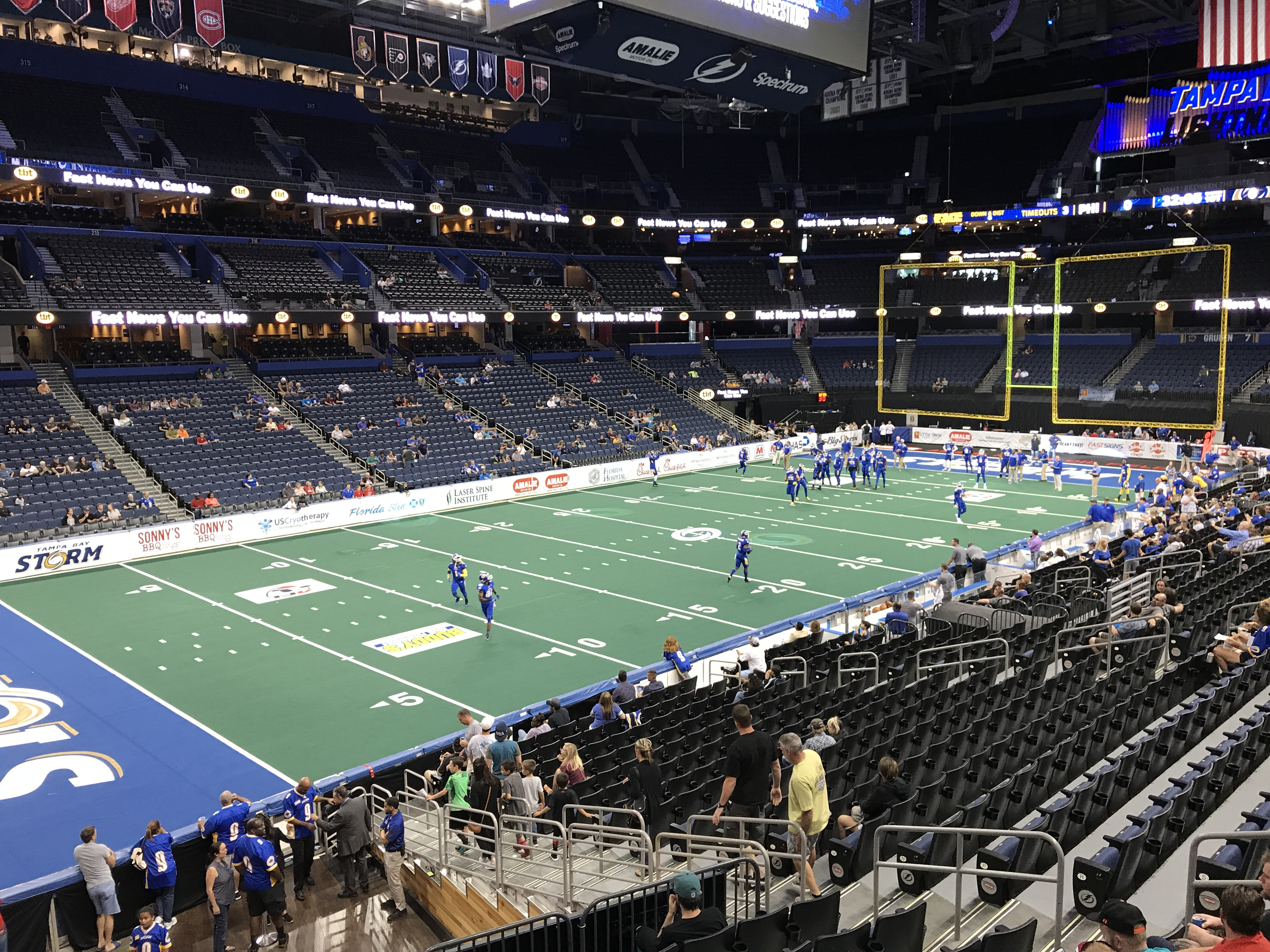
Interior from concourse level during a Tampa Bay Storm game in 2017.

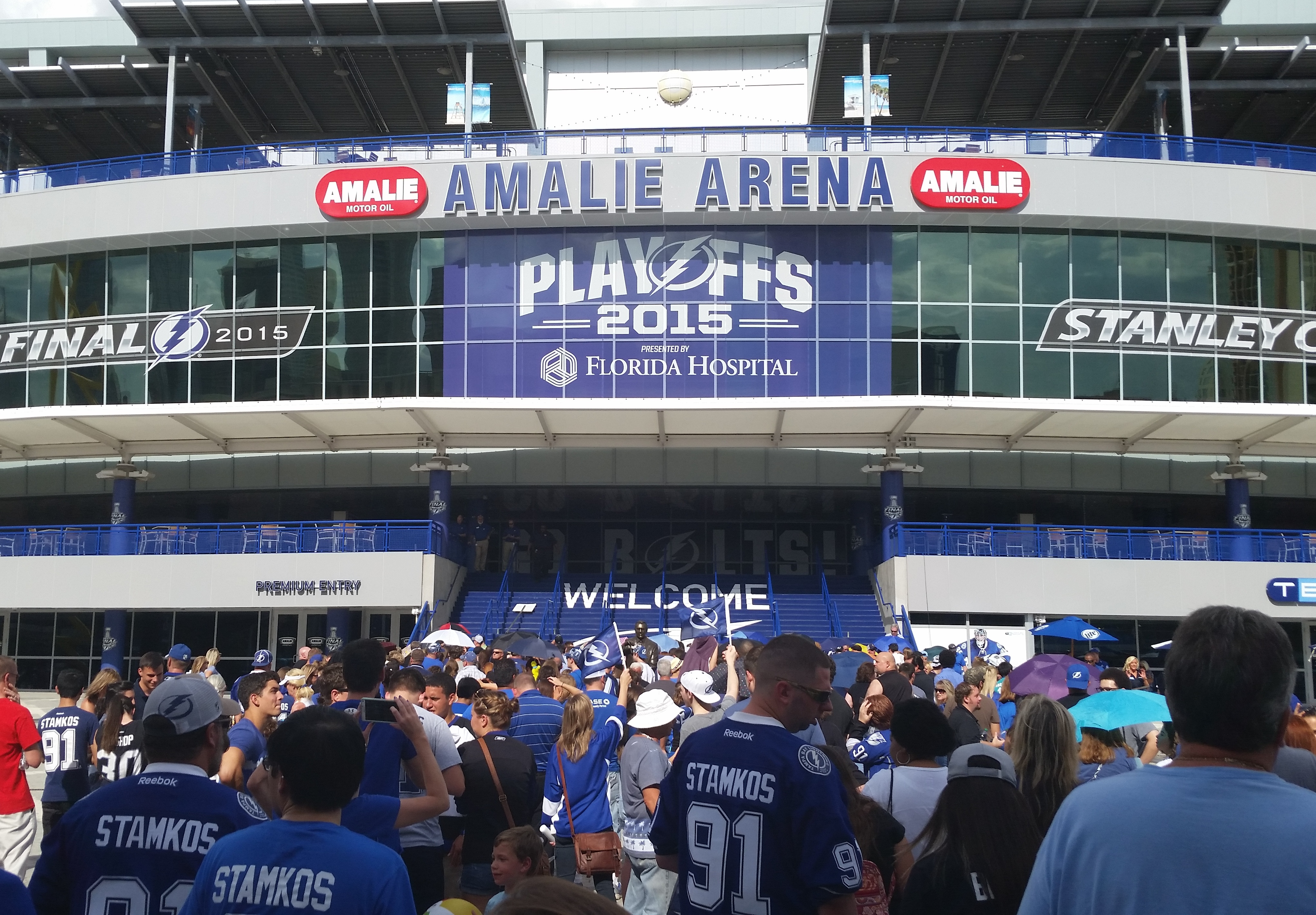
Watch party outside the entrance to the arena during game six of the 2015 Stanley Cup Final

== See also ==
- Downtown Tampa
- List of indoor arenas in the United States
- Scotiabank Arena (permanent home of the Toronto Raptors)
- 2020–21 Toronto Raptors season
- List of indoor arenas by capacity

Events and tenants
Preceded by ThunderDome	Home of the Tampa Bay Lightning; 1996 – present	Succeeded by current
Preceded by ThunderDome	Home of the Tampa Bay Storm; 1997 – 2017	Succeeded by Ceased operations
Preceded by General Motors Place; Staples Center	Host of the NHL All-Star Game; 1999; 2018	Succeeded by Air Canada Centre; SAP Center
Preceded by Xcel Energy Center; St. Paul, Minnesota	Host of the Frozen Four; 2012; 2016	Succeeded by Consol Energy Center; Pittsburgh
Preceded by Quicken Loans Arena; Bridgestone Arena; Nationwide Arena	NCAA Women's Division I basketball tournament finals venue 2008; 2015; 2019	Succeeded by Scottrade Center; Lucas Oil Stadium; Alamodome
Preceded by Scotiabank Arena	Home of the Toronto Raptors; 2020– 2021	Succeeded by Scotiabank Arena
