= Oil City Armory =

- U.S. National Register of Historic Places
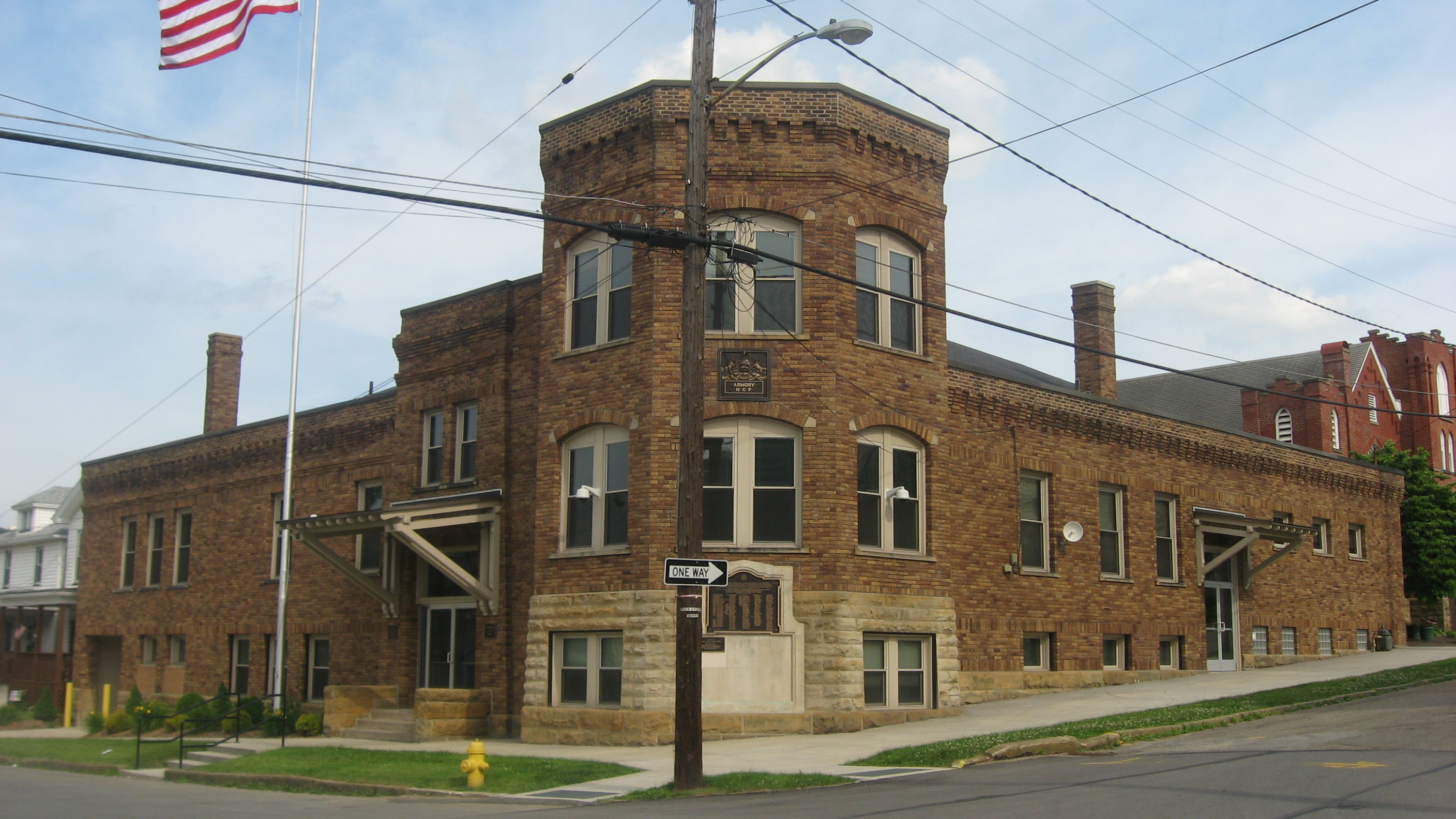
- Front of the armory

- Location within Pennsylvania Location within the United States
- Location: Jct. of E. 2nd and State Sts., Oil City, Pennsylvania
- Coordinates: 41°25′38″N 79°42′33″W
- Area: 0.3 acres (0.12 ha)
- Built: 1914
- Architect: Bailey, Emmett E., Co.; Cossau Bros.
- Architectural style: Late Victorian
- MPS: Pennsylvania National Guard Armories MPS
- NRHP reference No.: 91000517
- Added to NRHP: May 9, 1991

Oil City Armory is a historic National Guard armory located at Oil City, Venango County, Pennsylvania. It was built in 1914, and consists of a two-story administration section with a taller two-story drill hall in a Late Victorian style. The administration section has a taller three-story, corner, polygonal office tower with Gothic-influenced window surrounds. The drill hall measures 70 by 72 feet and has a roof supported by Pratt trusses.

It was added to the National Register of Historic Places in 1991. It is located in the Oil City South Side Historic District.
