= Oil Creek Library District =

Public library district in Pennsylvania, United States

Coordinates: 41.42890°N 79.71149°W

- Location: 2 Central Ave Oil City, Pennsylvania 16301
- Established: May 1996

Access and use
- Population served: 140,172 across Clarion, Jefferson, and Venango Counties

Other information
- Website: Oil Creek Library District

The Oil Creek Library District is an administrative unit designated by the Pennsylvania Office of Commonwealth Libraries and provides public library services in Clarion, Venango, and Jefferson Counties. The District's offices are currently located at the Oil City Library, a public library serving approximately 11,000 people in the city and surrounding areas.

== History ==
The Oil Creek Library District is the successor to the now defunct Clarion Library District. The District was created in May 1996.

=== District Services ===
The Oil Creek Library District provides professional consultation to its member libraries on all issues and topics pertaining to public libraries and the library profession. Additionally, the District provides Inter-Library Loan Support, Continuing Education opportunities, and shared Electronic Resources to its members.

== Library resources ==
The Oil Creek Library District maintains subscriptions to OverDrive, RBDigital Magazines, Chilton Auto Repair Database, and Tutor.com for the benefit of the patrons at its member libraries. The District also has a collection of Maker Kits available to libraries for programming. Additionally, there is an ever growing collection of professional materials. These materials are available for loan to member librarians and may also be borrowed by the public. The Library District and its member libraries are members of the Access PA statewide library system.
