= Belmont Hotel (Belmont, New York) =

- U.S. National Register of Historic Places
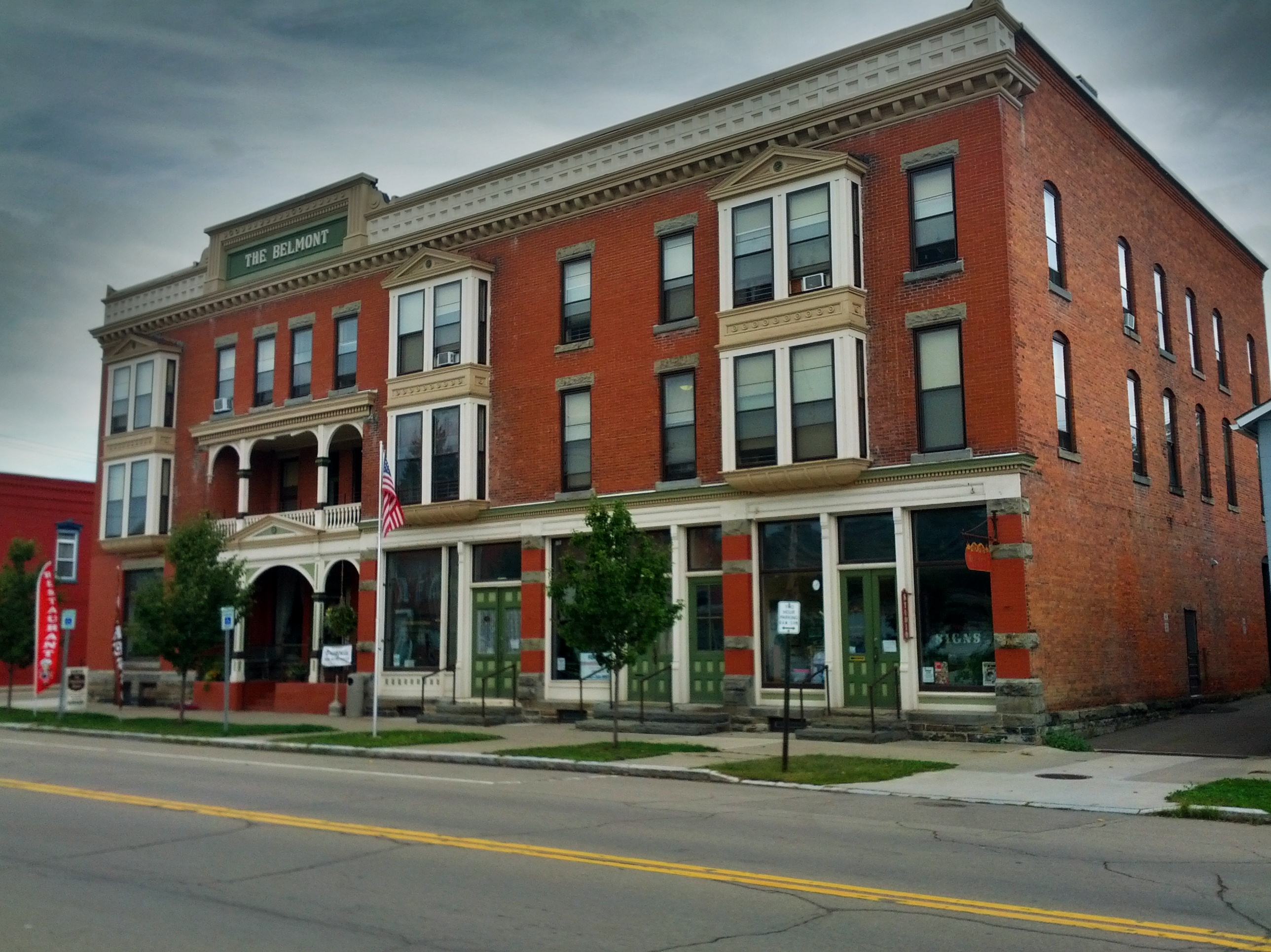
- Belmont Hotel, September 2012

- Location within New York Location within the United States
- Location: 40-48 Schuyler St., Belmont, New York
- Coordinates: 42°13′24″N 78°1′58″W
- Area: less than one acre
- Built: 1890
- Architect: Curtis & Archer
- Architectural style: Late Victorian
- NRHP reference No.: 01001319
- Added to NRHP: December 3, 2001

Belmont Hotel (Belmont, New York) The Belmont Hotel is a historic hotel building located at 40–48 Schuyler Street in Belmont, Allegany County, New York. It is a three-story brick structure built in 1890 to designs by Fredonia architects Enoch A. Curtis and William Archer. The building features Late Victorian architectural elements, including cast iron storefronts and an arcaded loggia on the first floor. Adjacent to the Allegany County Courthouse, it historically served as a central venue for the county's social, business, and political activities. It was listed on the National Register of Historic Places on December 3, 2001 (reference number 01001319).

== Current use ==
Following a period of disrepair, the building was restored in the 2010s and repurposed as a mixed-use facility. It now houses the Fountain Arts Center, a non-profit cultural venue offering art exhibitions, classes, music rehearsals, youth programs, and community events. The upper floors contain 19 affordable housing units known as The Apartments at The Belmont, managed by Arbor Housing and Development. These one- and two-bedroom apartments are part of the Low-Income Housing Tax Credit (LIHTC) program, with rents restricted for low-income households; the property accepts Section 8 Housing Choice Vouchers. Amenities include central air, an elevator, on-site laundry, a community room, and off-street parking.
