= Reuben Gridley Wright Farm Complex =

Historic house in New York, United States

- Wright, Reuben Gridley, Farm Complex
- U.S. National Register of Historic Places
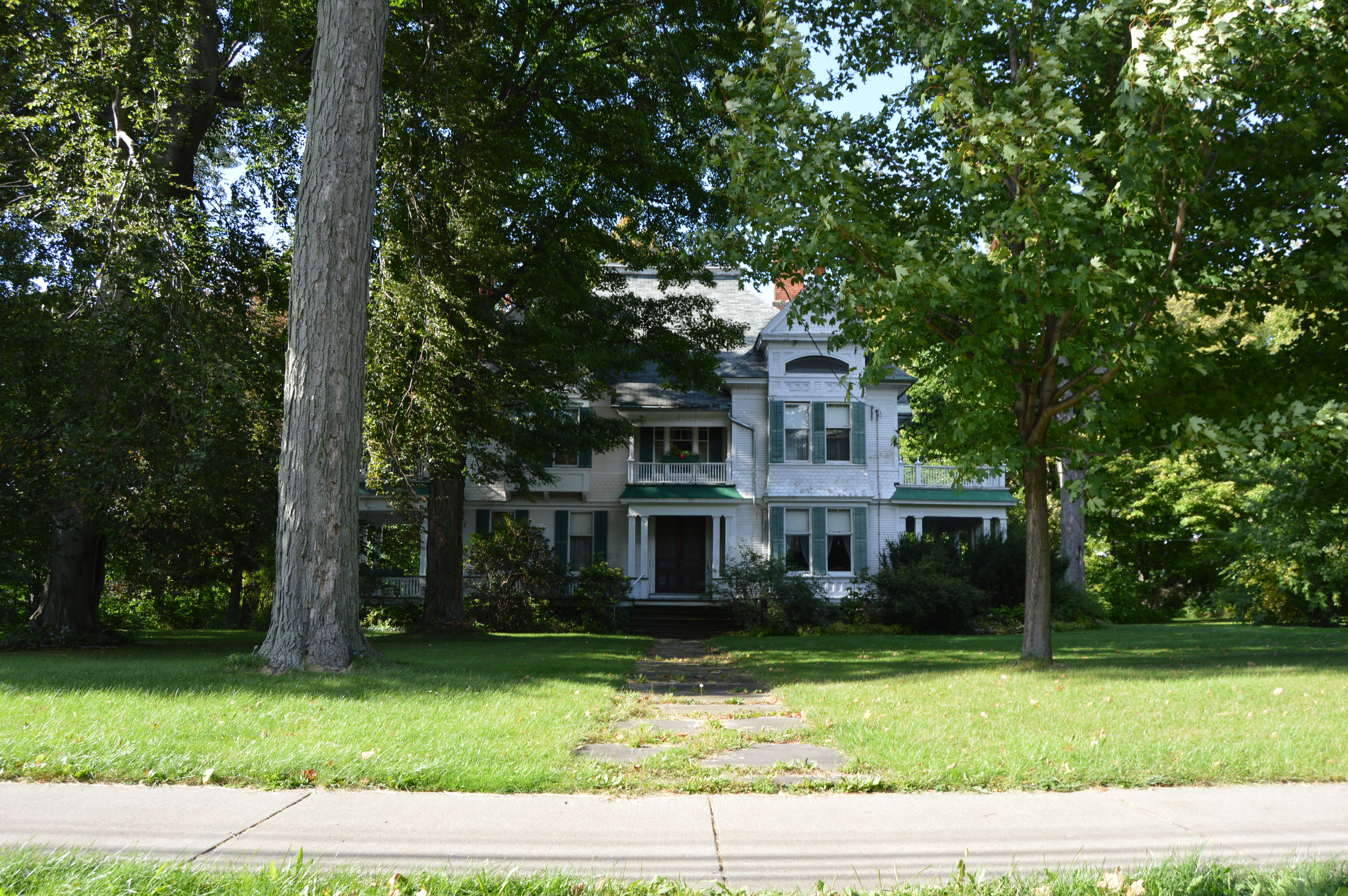
- Roadside view of the farmhouse

- Location within New York Location within the United States
- Location: 233 E. Main St., Westfield, New York
- Coordinates: 42°20′1″N 79°33′54″W
- Built: 1883
- Architect: Enoch A. Curtis; Harry Wratten
- Architectural style: Gothic
- MPS: Westfield Village MRA
- NRHP reference No.: 83001659
- Added to NRHP: September 26, 1983

Reuben Gridley Wright Farm Complex is a historic home and farm complex located at Westfield in Chautauqua County, New York. The home is a two-story wood frame Queen Anne style dwelling built in 1883 for Rueben Gridley Wright, one of Westfield's most prominent citizens. The house was designed by Fredonia architect Enoch A. Curtis. The property includes five contributing farm outbuildings that relate to its operation as an extensive late 19th century vineyard operation.

It was listed on the National Register of Historic Places in 1983.
