= George Carpenter (pilot) =

- Born: May 14, 1917; Townville, Pennsylvania
- Died: July 2, 2005 (aged 88)
- Military career
- Allegiance: United States; Canada
- Branch: United States Army (1941); Royal Canadian Air Force (1941–42); United States Army Air Forces (1942–45)
- Service years: 1941–1945
- Rank: Major
- Unit: No. 121 Squadron RAF
- Commands: 335th Fighter Squadron
- Conflicts: World War II
- Awards: Distinguished Flying Cross (6); Air Medal (4)

George Carpenter (May 14, 1917 – July 2, 2005) was an American pilot who was born in Townville, Pennsylvania and grew up in Oil City, Pennsylvania.

Carpenter enlisted in the United States Army in March 1941 but was rejected from flight training because of a reaction to an inoculation. He left the U.S. Army and by Christmas 1941 he had earned his wings in the Royal Canadian Air Force. He shipped out to England and was assigned to No. 121 Squadron RAF. He remained with the unit after it was absorbed into the United States Army Air Forces as a member of 335th Fighter Squadron. He was Squadron Operations Officer from December 1943 until becoming commanding officer of the squadron on February 5, 1944.

On 18 April 1944, he was shot down by Luftwaffe fighters over Germany. He bailed out and was made a prisoner of war. He is credited with 13.883 aerial victories, all but one scored with the P-51B Mustang between 16 March and 12 April 1944. He was awarded the Distinguished Flying Cross with five Oak Leaf Clusters and the Air Medal with three Oak Leaf Clusters.
