= Amalie Oil Company =

American company that manufactures automotive fluids

- Founded: 1903; 123 years ago in Franklin, Pennsylvania
- Headquarters: Tampa, Florida, United States
- Website: www.amalie.com

Amalie Oil Company is an American company that manufactures various weights of motor oil, synthetic oil, transmission fluid, and other automotive fluids. The company was founded in Franklin, Pennsylvania, in 1903, giving rise to its current slogan "Better than it has to be... Since 1903."

The company was the first to sell multi-grade motor oil and is currently North America's largest private, independent blender of motor oils and industrial lubricants. Amalie primarily produces private label products for companies such as Walmart, O'Reilly Auto Parts, Advance Auto Parts, Carquest and AutoZone but is starting to sell its own branded products more widely. The company also owns the Wolf's Head brand.

The company is currently run by the Barkett family. The Barketts entered the motor oil business by buying Petroleum Packers, a company in Port Tampa Bay, in 1977. In 1997 the Barketts acquired Amalie Oil from Sun Oil Company and merged Petroleum Packers into Amalie. The combined company has been headquartered in Tampa, Florida, since 1998. As the company attempts to increase its brand awareness, it has become increasingly visible in the Tampa Bay area. Since 2011 Amalie has been the home field sponsor of the Tampa Bay Storm of the Arena Football League. From 2014 to 2025, Amalie had the naming rights to the then Tampa Bay Times Forum and the Forum was renamed Amalie Arena. The company is also a sponsor of the arena's tenants the Tampa Bay Lightning of the NHL and the Tampa Bay Storm. The company is also the title sponsor of the Gatornationals and a sponsor of the National Hot Rod Association.
