= Wolf's Head (motor oil) =

American motor oil brand

Wolf's Head is a brand of motor oil. The company that first manufactured Wolf's Head was founded in Reno, Pennsylvania in 1879, when crude oil was being distilled into lamp oil. The company later began producing engine lubrications and numerous blends of motor oil. Advertising slogans have been "Finest of the Fine Since 1879" and "Run With the Wolf." Amalie Oil Company of Tampa, Florida now owns the rights to the brand name.

== History ==
A. L. Confer (1843 - 1928) was a railroad station agent in Reno, Pennsylvania, which is in the Oil Region. Confer decided to become an oil broker, and in 1879 he set up a primitive oil refining "still" in Reno. On the side of the still was a sign reading The Empire Oil Works.

By carefully controlling temperatures in the heating and cooling process Confer produced a better quality of illuminating oil (later known as kerosene) for use in oil lamps. Only a small portion of crude oil was used in making kerosene, so Confer experimented on the formerly-wasted oil by-products and produced steam engine lubrication. In 1885 he formed The Empire Oil & Grease Company.

The company grew, with oil refineries in Reno, Pennsylvania and offices in Oil City, Pennsylvania.

For a brief time the company refined gasoline, but decided to concentrate on lubricants and motor oil. Special blends of motor oil were manufactured for automobiles, outboard motor boat engines, and airplanes. During World War II the engines for Flying Fortresses were broken in on Wolf's Head oil. During the decades when Wolf's Head oil was refined in Reno only Pennsylvania crude oil was used.

== Name changes ==
When A. L. Confer had one small oil distillery tank he informally called his operation The Empire Oil Works, and in 1885 he formed The Empire Oil & Grease Company. Then in 1925 he reverted the name back to Empire Oil Works, Inc.

C. H. Ellingwood, who had organized The Wolverine Lubricants Company, joined The Empire Oil Works in 1911, and in 1929 the business name become the Wolverine-Empire Oil Refining Company. The final name change was in 1940, when the company became Wolf's Head Oil Refining Company.

== Brand name ownership ==
In January 1963 Pennzoil purchased 76% of the Wolf's Head Oil Refining Company, and by August of that year they owned 99.56% of Wolf's Head common stock.

In 2002 Shell Oil acquired Pennzoil-Quaker State, and in 2006 Shell Oil sold Amalie Oil Company the rights to the Wolf's Head brand.
