= Oil City, Pennsylvania =

City in Pennsylvania, US

Oil City, Pennsylvania Tga:no's
- City
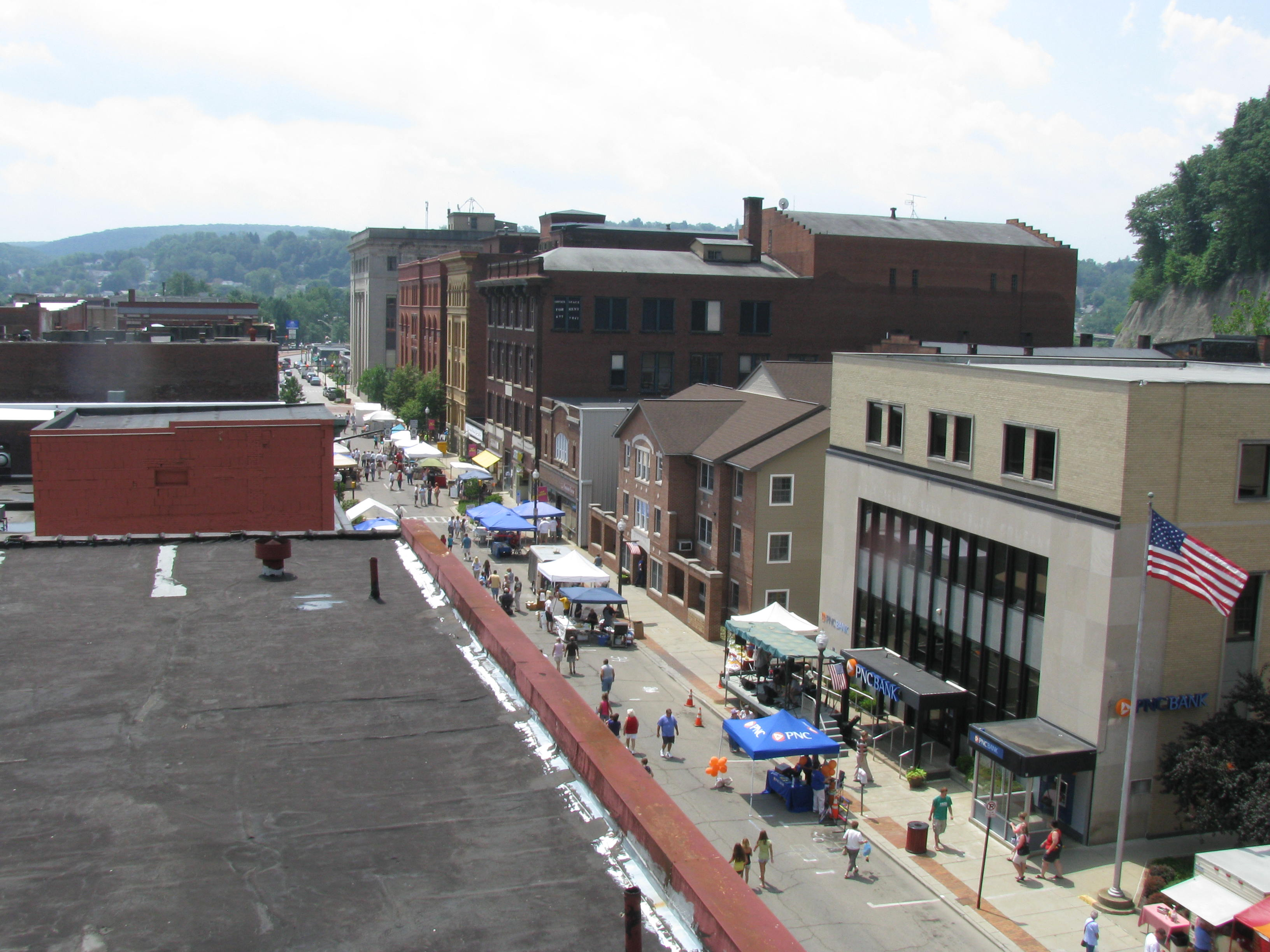
- Oil City Downtown Commercial Historic District

- Flag Seal
- Motto: "A Special Blend of People"
- Location in Venango County, Pennsylvania

- Location within Pennsylvania Location within the United States
- Coordinates: 41°25′42″N 79°42′26″W
- Country: United States
- State: Pennsylvania
- County: Venango
- Settled: 1824
- Incorporated (Borough): 1862
- Incorporated (City): 1871

Government
  - Type: Council/Manager
  - Mayor: John Kluck
  - City Manager: Michelle Hoovler

Area
  - Total: 4.84 sq mi (12.53 km^{2})
  - Land: 4.49 sq mi (11.64 km^{2})
  - Water: 0.34 sq mi (0.89 km^{2})

Population (2020)
  - Total: 9,613
  - Density: 2,139.8/sq mi (826.17/km^{2})
- Time zone: UTC-5 (Eastern (EST))
  - Summer (DST): UTC-4 (EDT)
- ZIP Code: 16301
- Area codes: 582; 814
- FIPS code: 42-56456
- Website: www.oilcity.org

Oil City (Seneca: Tga:no's) is the largest city in Venango County, Pennsylvania, United States. Known for its prominence in the initial exploration and development of the petroleum industry, it is located at a bend in the Allegheny River at the mouth of Oil Creek. The population was 9,608 at the 2020 census, and it is the principal city of the Oil City micropolitan area.

Initial settlement of Oil City was sporadic, and tied to the iron industry. After the first oil wells were drilled in 1861, it became central to the petroleum industry while hosting headquarters for the Pennzoil, Quaker State, and Wolf's Head motor oil companies. Tourism plays a prominent role in the region by promoting oil heritage sites, nature trails, and Victorian architecture.

== History ==
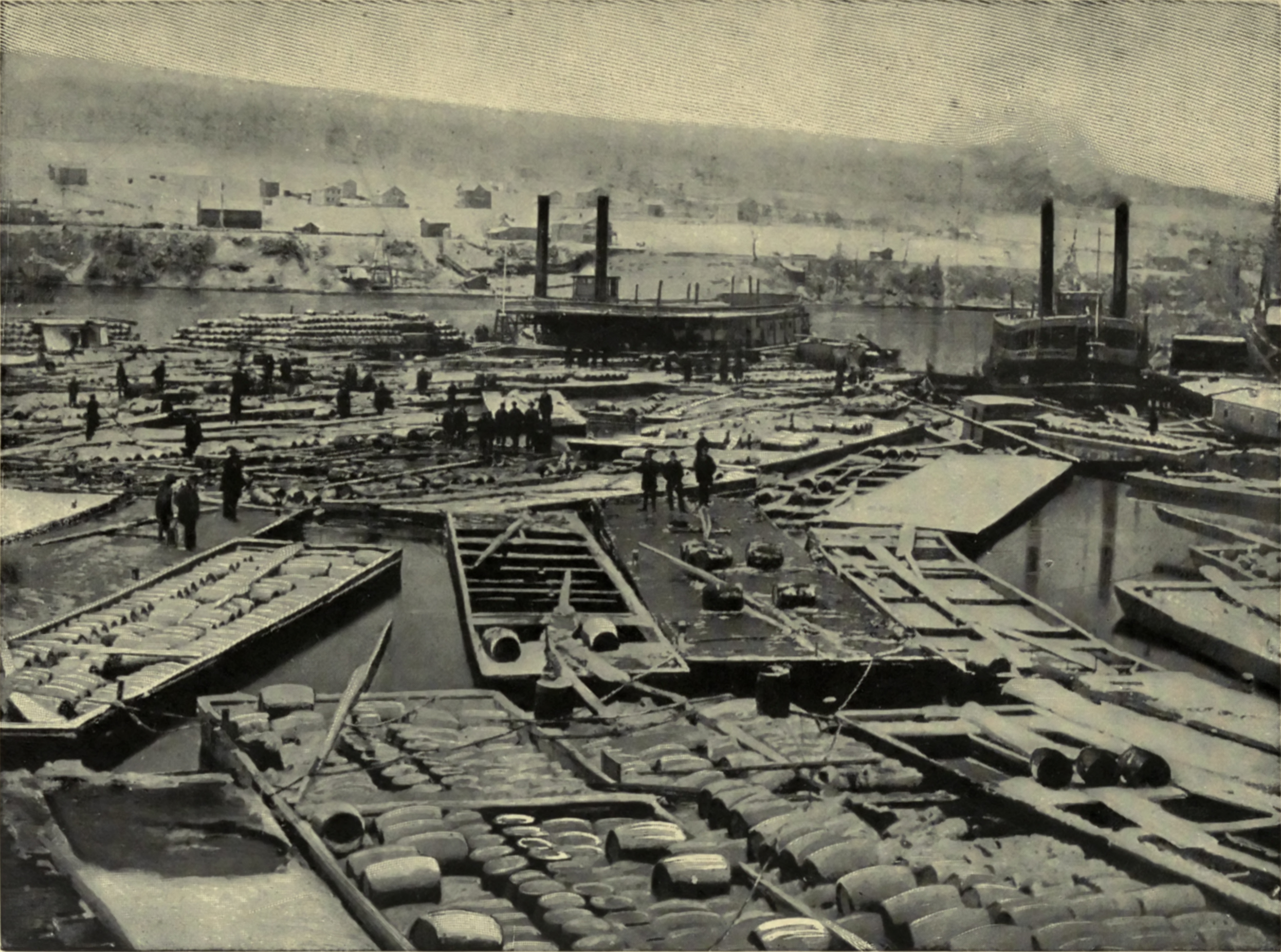
Fleet of Oil Boats at Oil City, 1864

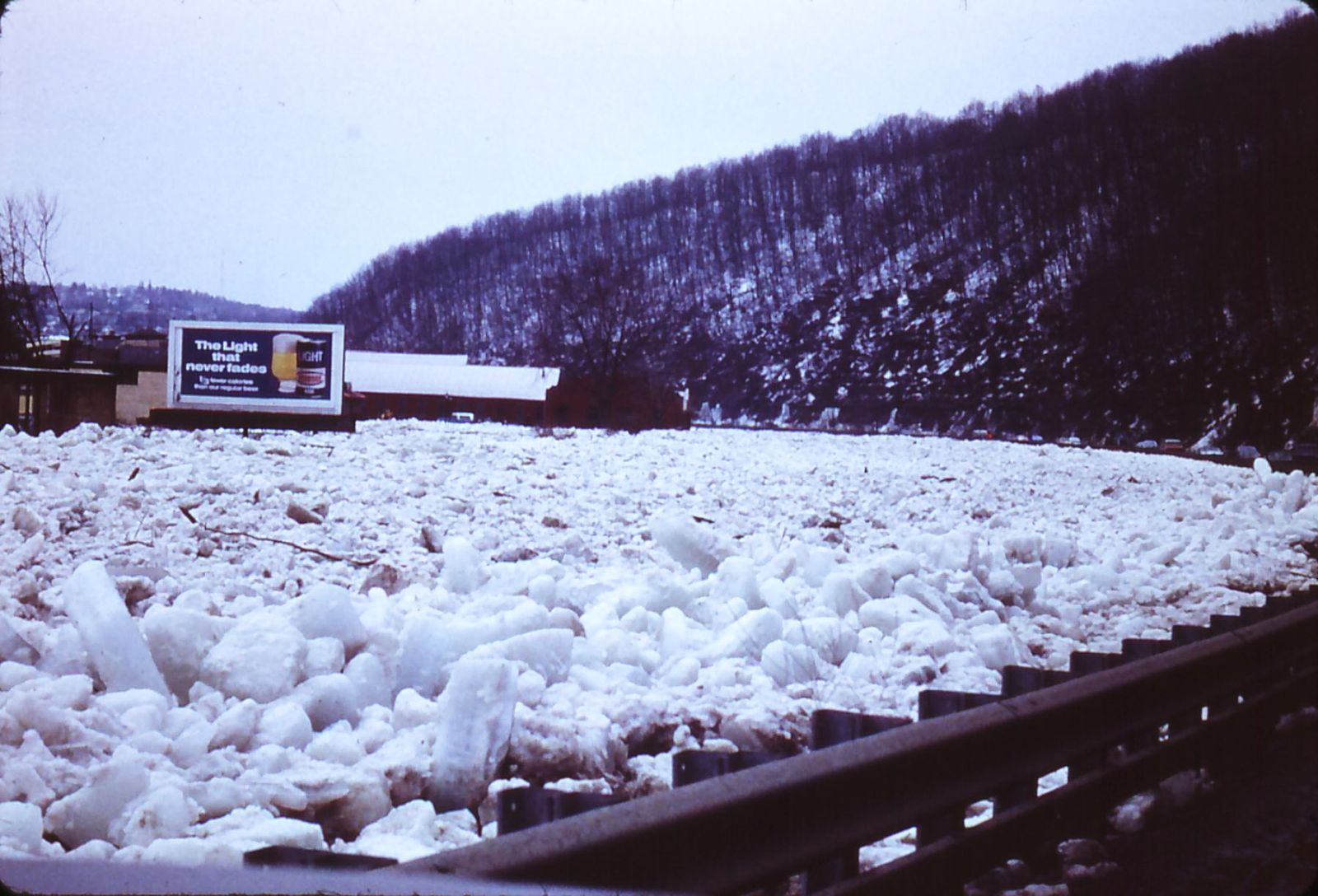
Ice jam on Oil Creek near Oil City, during mid/late 1970s

=== Cornplanter Tract and Oil Creek Furnace ===
In 1796, the state of Pennsylvania gave Cornplanter, chief of the Wolf Band of the Seneca nation, 1,500 acres (6.1 km^{2}) of land along the west bank of the Allegheny River in Warren County, Pennsylvania, as well as a small tract on both sides of the mouth of Oil Creek, in compensation for his services during the American Revolutionary War. The first white settler in what became Oil City was an unknown individual who cleared and farmed about 400 acres (1.6 km^{2}) on the west side of Oil Creek upstream from Cornplanter's land. Francis Halyday (or Holliday) purchased this land in 1803, and settled there with his family. The first white child known to be born in what became Oil City was James Halyday, born January 13, 1809. Three or four other families soon settled on the east side of the creek above the "Cornplanter Tract".

Cornplanter sold the eastern half of his tract to two white settlers, William Connely and William Kinnear, in May 1818. Connely sold his quarter of the original tract back to Cornplanter in October 1818, but the land was seized by the county for nonpayment of taxes and sold at auction in November 1819 to Alexander McCalmont. McCalmont sold his land to Mathias Stockberger in the spring of 1824.

On June 25, 1824, Kinnear, Stockerberger, and settler Richard Noyes formed William Kinnear & Co., a company which swiftly erected an iron bloomery, foundry, gristmill, and several warehouses. A mill race provided water power for the furnace. Homes were built for workers, and a steamboat landing constructed on the Allegheny River. This settlement was called Oil Creek Furnace. Settler James Young opened the first general store in town, and operated it in the 1850s.

The original incorporators were bought out by brothers William and Frederick Crary in January 1825. The company was purchased in February 1835 by William Bell, who changed the corporate name to W. Bell & Son. He and his son, Samuel, operated the furnace until 1849, employing about 40 men. The poor quality of iron ore in the area made their operations unprofitable and the furnace closed in 1849. The settlement was soon deserted, except for two families (the Bannons and the Halydays).

=== Deserted Oil Creek Furnace ===
The bend in the Allegheny River at Oil City slowed the speed of the river's waters, providing a spot for barges and rafts to land easily. For many years, the Bannons and Halydays rented rooms in their homes and space in their barns to bargemen and rafters using the landing at Oil Creek Furnace. About 1852 or 1853, Thomas Moran settled in the area and built a large inn (Moran House) next to the Bannon home. It proved popular and soon expanded, and became a local landmark. Samuel Hopewell opened a second inn shortly after Moran, and in the fall 1852 his brother, John P. Hopewell, opened a third inn and a new general store on Main Street. Settler Hiram Gordon opened the Red Lion, the area's first saloon, about the same time Hopewell's store began operation. Located near the mouth of Oil Creek, the saloon provided live entertainment. In June 1856, 1,000 acres (4.0 km^{2}) of the property was sold by the Bell heirs to Graff, Hasson & Company. James Hasson, son William Hasson, and William's family took up residence on the tract and began farming.

Although the village of Oil Creek Furnace was largely deserted, settlement continued in the area. On August 6, 1840, Benjamin Thompson patented nearly all of what is now Oil City east of Oil Creek and north of the Allegheny. This land was quickly subdivided and sold to other settlers. With the death of his mother in 1844, James Halyday sold his land about 1846 to Dr. John Nevins and several other settlers. Nevins was a physician, the first to practice medicine in the area. James Hollis patented 200 acres (0.81 km^{2}) of land on the south side of the Allegheny River in 1851, and purchased the remainder of Thompson's land on January 3, 1853. Hollis, in turn, sold all his land on April 25 to Henry Bastian.

=== Laytonia, Cottage Hill, Imperial City, and Leetown ===
Edwin L. Drake drilled the first commercially successful oil well in nearby Titusville on August 27, 1859. Oil was struck on the Downing farm south of the river by Phillips & Vanusdall in April 1861. Oil City had fewer than six families living there in 1859. The discovery of oil changed that. By 1868, a number of boomtowns had emerged in the region, including Oil City, Petroleum Center, Pithole, Rynd Farm, and Titusville. By 1860, the oil trade was far and away the dominant industry in the Oil City area. A machine shop (which constructed pipe fittings), warehouses, and other industrial structures were built on the west side of Oil Creek. Barges were used to transport oil down Oil Creek and into Oil City, where it was transferred to steamboats or bulk barges to continue on to Pittsburgh and other locations.

In 1859, Nevins sold his property to the Michigan Rock Oil Company, (Note: "Rock oil" was an early term for crude oil.) which built Main Avenue, platted an unnamed town around it, and erected a few buildings. On March 26, 1863, Henry Bastian sold his land to William L. Lay, who established a ferry near what is now the foot of Central Avenue. He platted a town of 80 lots near his ferry's landing on the south shore, and named the town Laytonia (sometimes referred to as "Laytona" or "Latona"). (Note: Laytonia Street marked the western boundary of Lay's village. It is now called Reed Street.) The same year, Charles Haines and Joseph Martin bought out the Hassons (who had continued to farm their land), and graded Grove Avenue. The two built a number of homes along the street, calling their settlement Cottage Hill. The United Petroleum Farms Association purchased part of Cottage Hill as well as an adjoining 300 acres (1.2 km^{2}) in 1864. The company subdivided the land into lots and swiftly built homes here.

In 1865, Vandergrift, Forman & Company, a petroleum exploration firm, bought the property of a number of settlers around the north landing of Lay's Ferry and established a town the company called Imperial City. (Note: Clusters of existing homes, one called Albion and the other Downington, were incorporated into Imperial City.) West of Laytonia, Charles Lee established a settlement called Leetown.

=== Founding of Oil City ===
In 1862, residents in the area obtained a charter from the state, uniting the area north of the river as a borough named Oil City. South of the river, in particular, growth continued to be haphazard. Streets there often did not match up, hindering transportation. Residents realized that there were too many names in use for this area, which was causing problems. In 1866, the citizens of the borough south of the river petitioned Judge William G. Trunkey to give their borough a common name. He selected Venango City. By 1866, Venango City had a population of more than 1,500, and more than 4,500 people lived in Oil City.

Oil City began platting extensive areas of land between 1869 and 1872. This included the upper and lower south side, Palace Hill, upper Cottage Hill and Clark's Summit. A 1,600-foot (490 m) long funicular ascended the 460-foot (140 m) high hill. Built in 1872, the Panic of 1873 devastated home sales on Clark's Summit. The funicular company went bankrupt, and the track was removed in 1879. In 1869, Thomas Martindale opened the first health food store in Oil City, thought to be the first natural foods store in the United States.

By 1870, residents of Oil City and Venango City desired unification of their joint, growing metropolis. They sought a town charter from the state, which was granted by the legislature on March 3, 1871. Oil City was the name of the unified boroughs. The first Oil City elections were held in April, and the first mayor, William M. Williams, and 12-member city council sworn in on April 11, completing the act of incorporation. Oil City replaced its charter with a new one in January 1881 after the state implemented a new township charter law. A city hall was erected later that year on Seneca Street.

=== Post-charter Oil City ===
The city was partially destroyed by flood in 1865 and by both flood and fire in 1866 and again in 1892; on this last occasion, several oil tanks that were struck by lightning gave way, and Oil Creek carried a mass of burning oil into the city, where some 60 people died and property valued at more than $1 million was destroyed. Oil City grew into a thriving community through the later half of the 19th century and into the 20th century. By the 1990s, Pennzoil, Quaker State, and Wolf's Head had all relocated their headquarters elsewhere. However, some oil wells continue to produce a steady supply of quality petroleum.

Regional governments and public organizations promote tourism by thoroughly educating the public about oil history. Oil City's location along the Allegheny River in the foothills of the Appalachian Mountains provides excellent opportunities for exploring Northwestern Pennsylvania.

The Oil City Downtown Commercial Historic District, Oil City North Side Historic District, Oil City South Side Historic District, National Transit Building, and Oil City Armory are listed on the National Register of Historic Places.

== Geography ==
Oil City, Pennsylvania is located at the confluence of the Allegheny River and Oil Creek at 41°25′42″N 79°42′26″W. According to the United States Census Bureau, the city has a total area of 4.7 square miles (12 km^{2}), of which 4.5 square miles (12 km^{2}) is land and 0.2 square miles (0.52 km^{2}) (4.65%) is water.

Many layers of rock and sedimentary material containing fossils can be seen on the bluffs in and around Oil City. Oil City is framed by the surrounding foothills with the Allegheny River winding through downtown.

The Allegheny River and Oil Creek freeze occasionally during the winter, sometimes causing ice jams; although remediation by the U.S. Army Corps of Engineers has reduced ice formation via a floating ice control structure on the river and a fixed concrete weir on the banks of the creek. Flooding of the river flats is a possibility throughout the year due to ice jams, excessive snow melt, large volume storms and hurricane or tropical storm remnants.

== Demographics ==
Historical population
| Census | Pop. | Note | %± |
|---|---|---|---|
| 1870 | 2,276 | | — |
| 1880 | 7,315 | | 221.4% |
| 1890 | 10,932 | | 49.4% |
| 1900 | 13,264 | | 21.3% |
| 1910 | 15,657 | | 18.0% |
| 1920 | 21,274 | | 35.9% |
| 1930 | 22,075 | | 3.8% |
| 1940 | 20,379 | | −7.7% |
| 1950 | 19,581 | | −3.9% |
| 1960 | 17,692 | | −9.6% |
| 1970 | 15,033 | | −15.0% |
| 1980 | 13,881 | | −7.7% |
| 1990 | 11,949 | | −13.9% |
| 2000 | 11,504 | | −3.7% |
| 2010 | 10,557 | | −8.2% |
| 2020 | 9,613 | | −8.9% |
| 2023 (est.) | 9,374 | | −2.5% |

=== 2020 census ===
As of the 2020 census, Oil City had a population of 9,613. The median age was 42.2 years. 22.0% of residents were under the age of 18 and 19.6% of residents were 65 years of age or older. For every 100 females there were 96.6 males, and for every 100 females age 18 and over there were 92.1 males age 18 and over.

98.6% of residents lived in urban areas, while 1.4% lived in rural areas.

There were 4,198 households in Oil City, of which 25.4% had children under the age of 18 living in them. Of all households, 33.9% were married-couple households, 23.0% were households with a male householder and no spouse or partner present, and 32.9% were households with a female householder and no spouse or partner present. About 37.1% of all households were made up of individuals and 16.9% had someone living alone who was 65 years of age or older.

There were 4,971 housing units, of which 15.6% were vacant. The homeowner vacancy rate was 3.1% and the rental vacancy rate was 13.3%.

Racial composition as of the 2020 census
| Race | Number | Percent |
|---|---|---|
| White | 8,844 | 92.0% |
| Black or African American | 170 | 1.8% |
| American Indian and Alaska Native | 13 | 0.1% |
| Asian | 19 | 0.2% |
| Native Hawaiian and Other Pacific Islander | 4 | 0.0% |
| Some other race | 59 | 0.6% |
| Two or more races | 504 | 5.2% |
| Hispanic or Latino (of any race) | 202 | 2.1% |

== Tourism ==
- Oil Creek State Park
- Indian God Rock
- Oil City Armory
- Oil City Northside
- Oil City Southside

== Media ==
WKQW 1120 AM and WLOQ 96.3 FM are Venango County's only locally owned radio stations. The Derrick Publishing Company published two newspapers serving the area, The Derrick (originally The Oil City Derrick) and The News-Herald of Franklin. The owner announced both papers would cease on March 20, 2026. As of March 2026, they’ve announced The Derrick and The News-Herald will continue to publish online through a partnership with the Oil Region Alliance.

== Sports ==
The Oil City Oilers were a Minor League Baseball team located in Oil City, Pennsylvania between 1940 and 1951. The team played in the Pennsylvania State Association from 1940 to 1942, and later moved to the Middle Atlantic League after World War II ended. The team began in 1940 when the Pittsburgh Pirates relocated their affiliate, the McKeesport Little Braves, to Oil City. The team stayed affiliated with the Pirates until 1947, when it began an affiliation with the Chicago White Sox and its name was changed to the Oil City Refiners. The team's name was changed to the Oil City A's when they merged with the Youngstown A's in 1951. The team folded, along with the league, at the end of that season. A number of Oil City's players also played in the major leagues, including Otto Denning, Mike Garbark, Al Gionfriddo, Elmer Klumpp, Junior Walsh, Hal Woodeshick, and Rudy York.

The Oilers name originated from the Oil City Oilers earlier team that represented the city in the 1895 and 1898 Iron And Oil League and the Oil City Cubs, who played as members of the Interstate League from 1906 to 1908.

The Oilers name continues to represent the sports teams and marching band of Oil City High School.

== Notable people ==
- Charles Almanzo Babcock, superintendent of schools who founded Bird Day
- Ronald Black, member of the Pennsylvania House of Representatives
- W. S. Borland, college football and college baseball coach
- George Carpenter, World War II flying ace
- William Holmes Crosby, one of the founding fathers of hematology
- Gabby Gabreski, World War II and Korean War flying ace
- Shauna Howe, child murder victim
- Scott Hutchinson, member of the Pennsylvania Senate
- Woody Jackson, composer and musician best known for his work in video games
- Joseph Levi, member of the Pennsylvania House of Representatives
- Chris Kirkpatrick, singer-songwriter who founded NSYNC
- Ben Koyack, National Football League player
- Josephine McKim, 1932 Olympic gold medal-winning swimmer
- Dusty Miller, Major League Baseball player
- George C. Rickards, chief of the Militia Bureau (now National Guard Bureau)
- Virgil Tupper, physician and surgeon

== See also ==
- Oil Creek Library District
- Oil Region National Heritage Area

== Bibliography ==
- Bell, Herbert C. (1890). History of Venango County, Pennsylvania: Its Past and Present. Chicago: Brown, Runk & Co.
- Eaton, S.J.M. (1876). Centennial Discourse: A Sketch of the History of Venango County, Pennsylvania. Franklin, Pa.: Venango Spectator Job Office.
- Hauptman, Laurence M. (2014). In the Shadow of Kinzua: The Seneca Nation of Indians Since World War II. Syracuse, N.Y.: Syracuse University Press. ISBN 9780815633280.
- Sherman, Jon (2002). Drake Well Museum and Park: Pennsylvania Trail of History Guide. Mechanicsburg, Pa.: Stackpole Books. ISBN 9780811729604.
