= Oil City Downtown Commercial Historic District =

Historic district in Pennsylvania, United States

- U.S. National Register of Historic Places
- U.S. Historic district
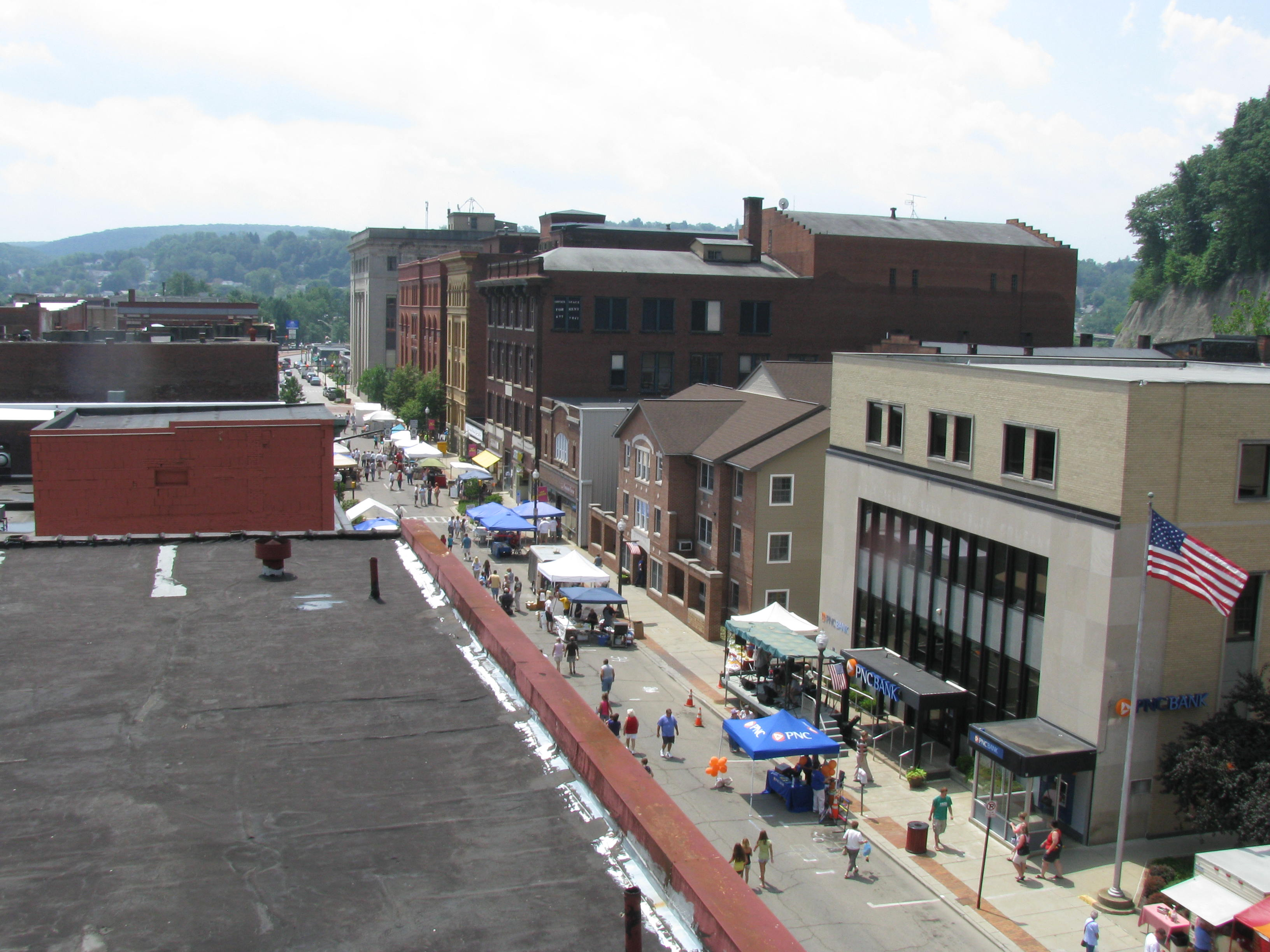
- Seneca Street, looking south

- Location within Pennsylvania Location within the United States
- Location: Generally along Seneca, Center, Elm, Sycamore, Duncomb, and Main Sts., Oil City, Pennsylvania
- Coordinates: 41°26′08″N 79°42′31″W
- Area: 25 acres (10 ha)
- Built: 1870
- Architect: Bailey, Emmett E.; Bresnot, Joseph P.
- Architectural style: Colonial Revival, Romanesque, Italianate
- MPS: Oil Industry Resources in Western Pennsylvania MPS
- NRHP reference No.: 97001250
- Added to NRHP: October 24, 1997

The Oil City Downtown Commercial Historic District is a national historic district that is located in Oil City, Venango County, Pennsylvania.

It was added to the National Register of Historic Places in 1997.

== History and architectural features ==
This district includes fifty-one contributing buildings and two contributing structures that are located in the central business district of Oil City. It primarily includes commercial buildings that were designed in a variety of popular architectural styles, including Romanesque Revival, Colonial Revival, and Italianate. Notable buildings include the General Telephone Company Building (1942), Trinity Methodist Episcopal Church (1924), the Oil City Boiler Works, Downs Block (1894), Veach Block (1896, 1913), the Drake Building (1928), and the Oil City National Bank (1926).

It was added to the National Register of Historic Places in 1997.
