= List of people from Pennsylvania =

State flag of Pennsylvania

Location of Pennsylvania in the United States

Pennsylvania, the fifth-most populous state in the United States, is the birthplace or childhood home of many famous Americans. People from Pennsylvania are sometimes called "Pennsylvanians".

The following is a list of notable Americans who were born in, or lived a significant portion of their lives in, Pennsylvania along with their primary Pennsylvania city or town of residence categorized by their respective field of notoriety.

== Actors and actresses ==
A–B

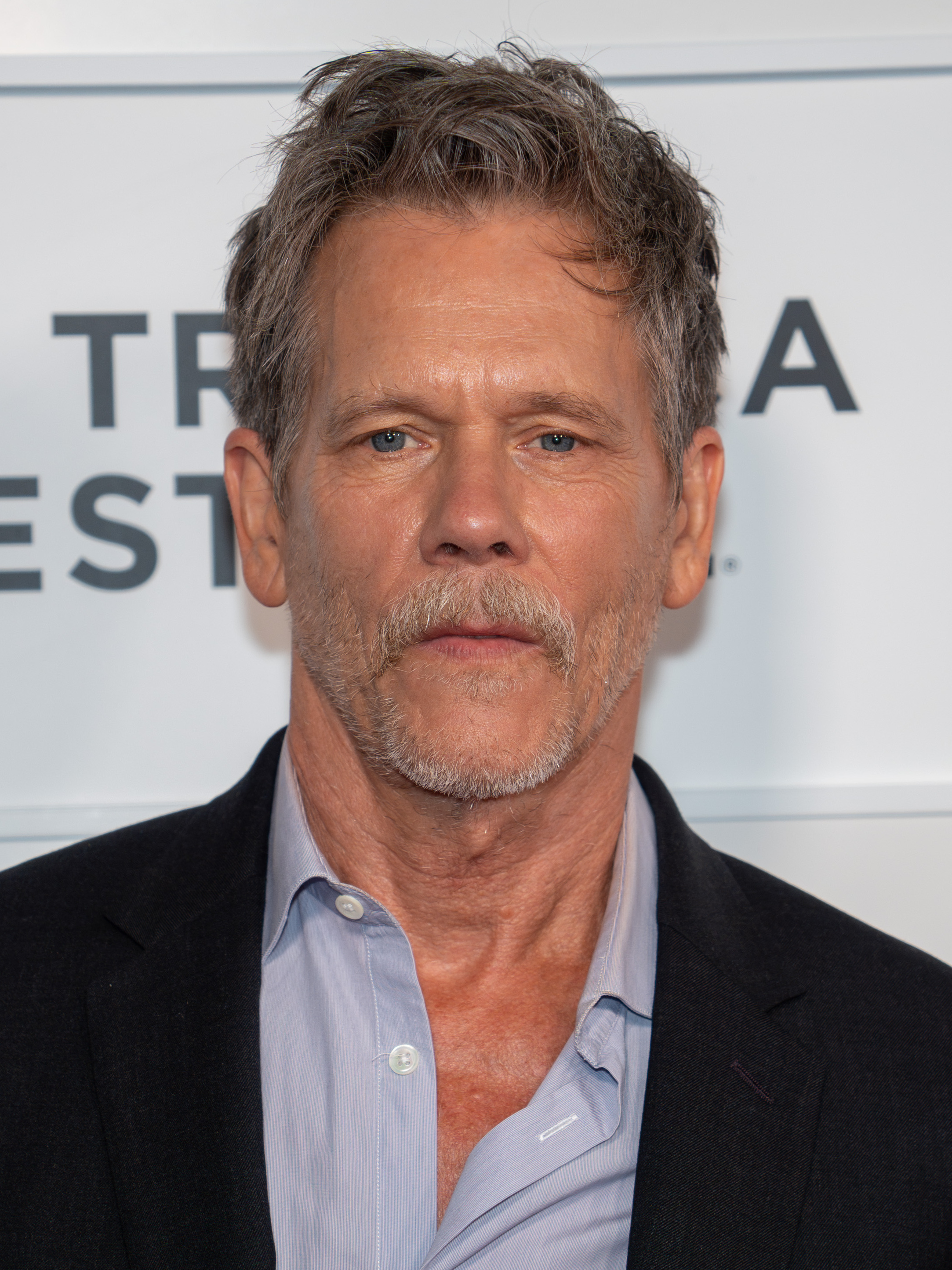
Kevin Bacon

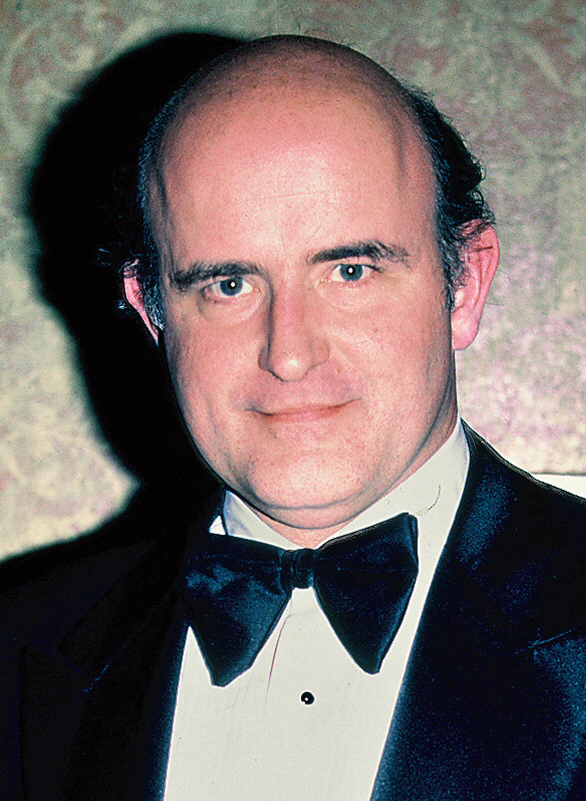
Peter Boyle

Quinta Brunson

- Erika Alexander—Philadelphia
- Keith Andes—Philadelphia
- Gerald Anthony—Pittsburgh
- Aquaria—West Chester
- Carmen Argenziano—Sharon
- Malcolm Atterbury—Philadelphia
- Frankie Avalon—Philadelphia
- Jack Avery—Susquehanna
- Val Avery—Philadelphia
- Kevin Bacon—Philadelphia
- Brian Baker—Philadelphia
- Carroll Baker—Johnstown
- Sue Ball—Philadelphia
- Mabel Ballin—Philadelphia
- George Bancroft—Philadelphia
- George Barbier—Philadelphia
- Vince Barnett—Pittsburgh
- Eddie Barry—Philadelphia
- Ethel Barrymore—Philadelphia
- John Barrymore—Philadelphia
- Lionel Barrymore—Philadelphia
- Eddie Barth—Philadelphia
- Jessica Barth—Philadelphia
- Billy Barty—Millsboro
- Blake Bashoff—Philadelphia
- Toni Basil—Philadelphia
- Victory Bateman—Philadelphia
- Henry Bean—Philadelphia
- Billy Beck—Philadelphia
- Laurie Beechman—Philadelphia
- Chris Beetem—Philadelphia
- Beth Behrs—Lancaster
- Willam Belli—Philadelphia
- Maria Bello—Norristown
- Julie Benz—Murrysville
- Jeff Bergman—Philadelphia
- Ed Bernard—Philadelphia
- Lyle Bettger—Philadelphia
- Marki Bey—Philadelphia
- Edward Binns—Philadelphia
- Joey Bishop—Philadelphia
- Larry Bishop—Philadelphia
- Janet Blair—Altoona
- Billy Blanks—Erie
- Marc Blucas—Butler
- Eleanor Boardman—Philadelphia
- Walter Bobbie—Scranton
- Rudy Bond—Philadelphia
- David Boreanaz—Philadelphia
- Christian Borle—Pittsburgh
- Elizabeth Crocker Bowers—Philadelphia
- Christian Bowman—Harrisburg
- Jim Boyd—Philadelphia
- Peter Boyle—Philadelphia
- Glenn Branca—Harrisburg
- Laura Breckenridge—Flourtown
- El Brendel—Philadelphia
- David Brenner—Philadelphia
- Al Bridge—Philadelphia
- Fran Brill—Chester
- Charles Bronson—Ehrenfeld
- Scott Martin Brooks—Philadelphia
- Robert Curtis Brown—Bucks County
- Quinta Brunson—Philadelphia
- Andrew Bryniarski—Philadelphia
- Bobby Burns—Philadelphia
- Edmund Burns—Philadelphia
- Steve Burns—Boyertown/Gilbertsville
- Fritzi Burr—Philadelphia
- Clarissa Burt—Philadelphia
- Eugene Byrd—Philadelphia

C–D

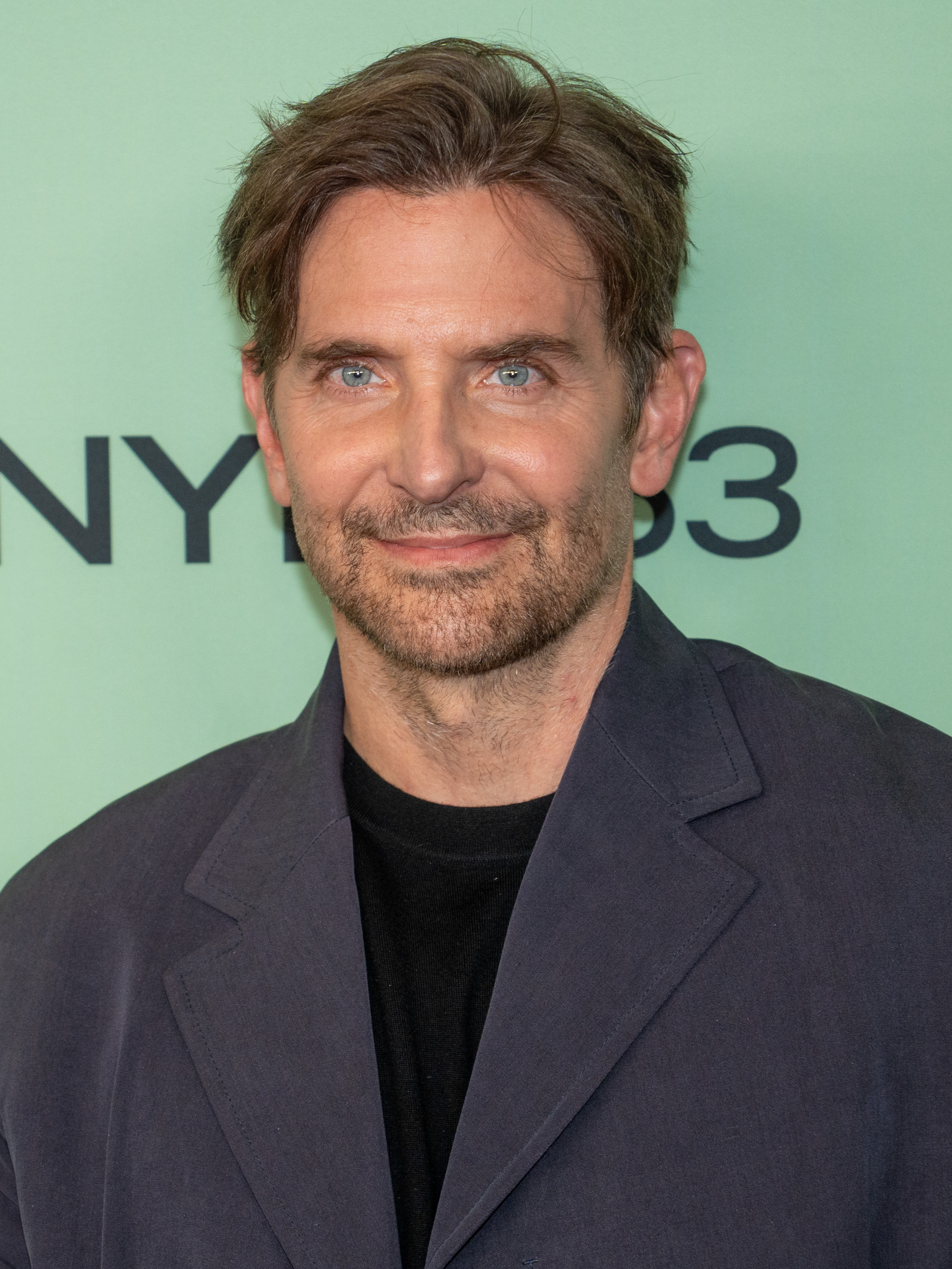
Bradley Cooper

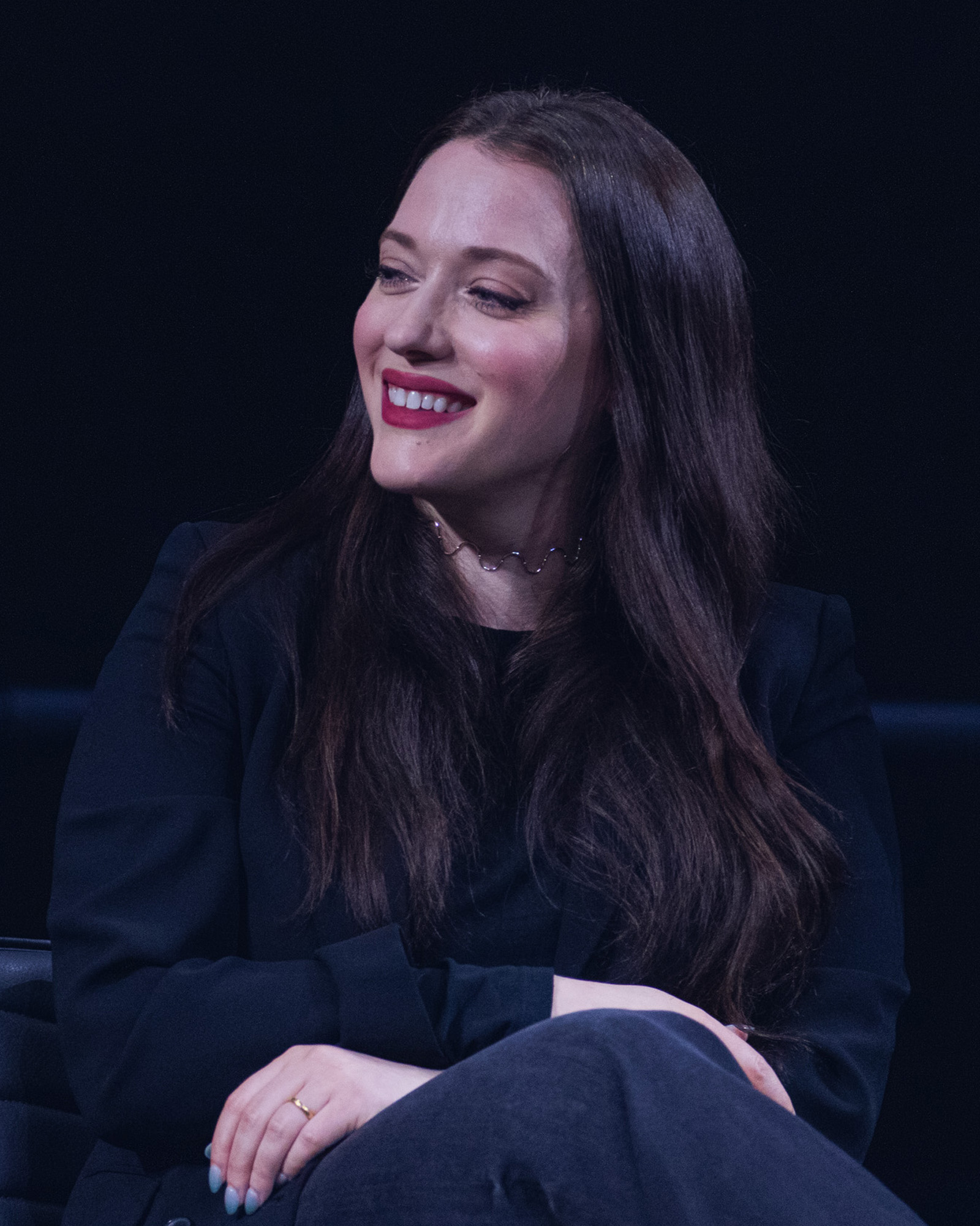
Kat Dennings

- Sabrina Carpenter—East Greenville
- Alexandra Chando—Bethlehem
- Kitty Chen—Philadelphia
- Dennis Christopher—Philadelphia
- Brian Patrick Clarke—Gettysburg
- Caitlin Clarke—Pittsburgh
- Lauren Cohan—Philadelphia
- Julia Cohen (born 1989)—Philadelphia
- Jack Coleman—Easton
- Marc Connelly—McKeesport
- Michael Constantine—Reading
- Josh Cooke—Philadelphia
- Bradley Cooper—Jenkintown
- Ellen Corby—Philadelphia
- Bill Cosby—Philadelphia
- Michael Cornacchia—Philadelphia
- Dolores Costello—Pittsburgh
- Maurice Costello—Pittsburgh
- Erin Cottrell—Yardley
- Broderick Crawford—Philadelphia
- Rebecca Creskoff—Philadelphia
- Pat Crowley—Olyphant
- Jon Daly—Pittsburgh
- James Darren—Philadelphia
- John Davidson—Pittsburgh
- Ann B. Davis—Erie
- Bruce Davison—Philadelphia
- John de Lancie—Philadelphia
- Kim Delaney—Roxborough
- Kat Dennings—Bryn Mawr
- Joe DeRosa—Collegeville
- Patti Deutsch—Pittsburgh
- Devon—Hellertown
- Mia Dillon—Newtown Township
- Joanie Dodds—Beaver Falls
- Jack Dodson—Pittsburgh
- John Doman—Philadelphia
- Heather Donahue—Upper Darby
- Omar Doom—Easton
- Ellen Albertini Dow—Mount Carmel
- Ralph Dunn—Titusville

E–G

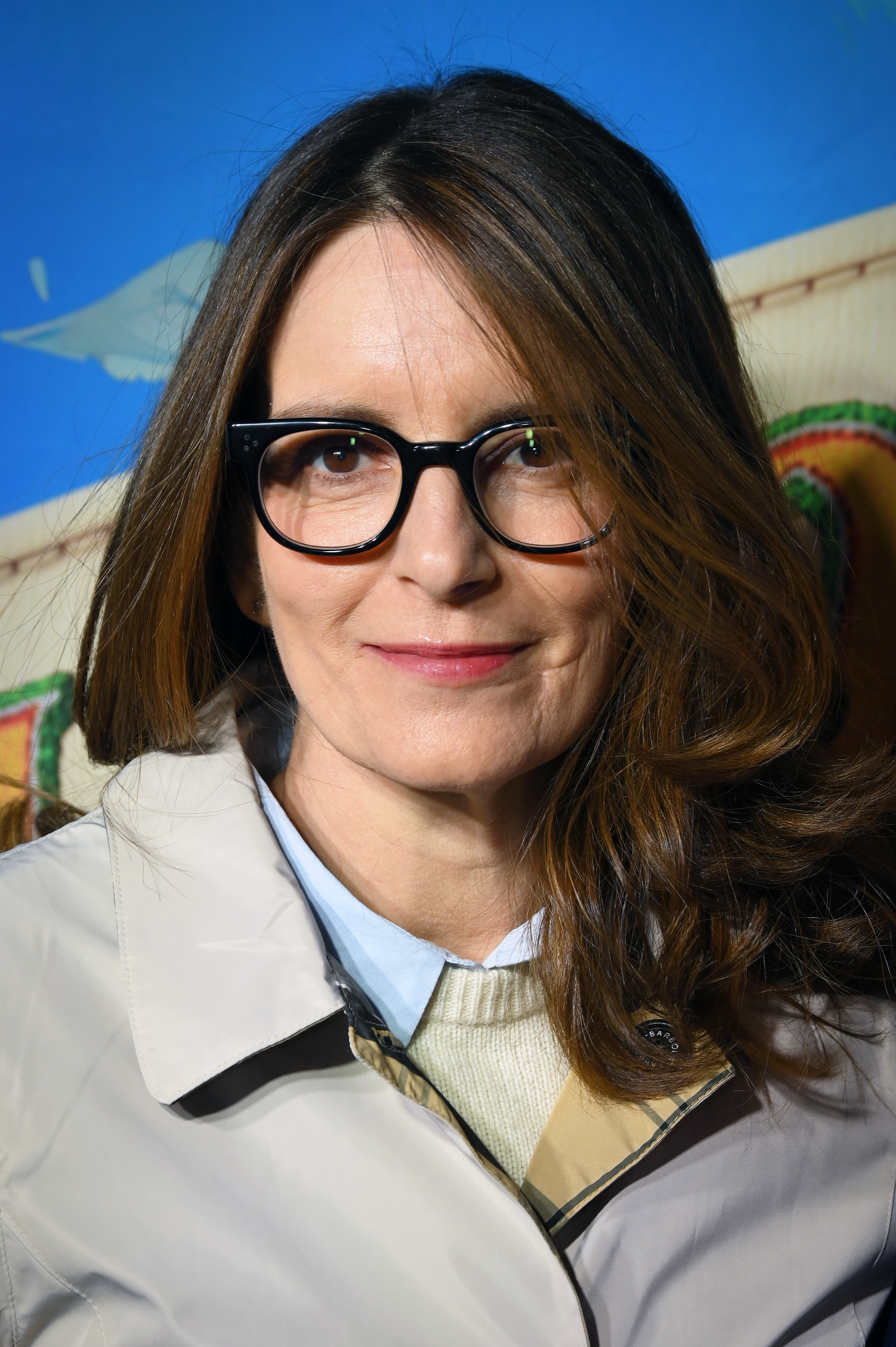
Tina Fey

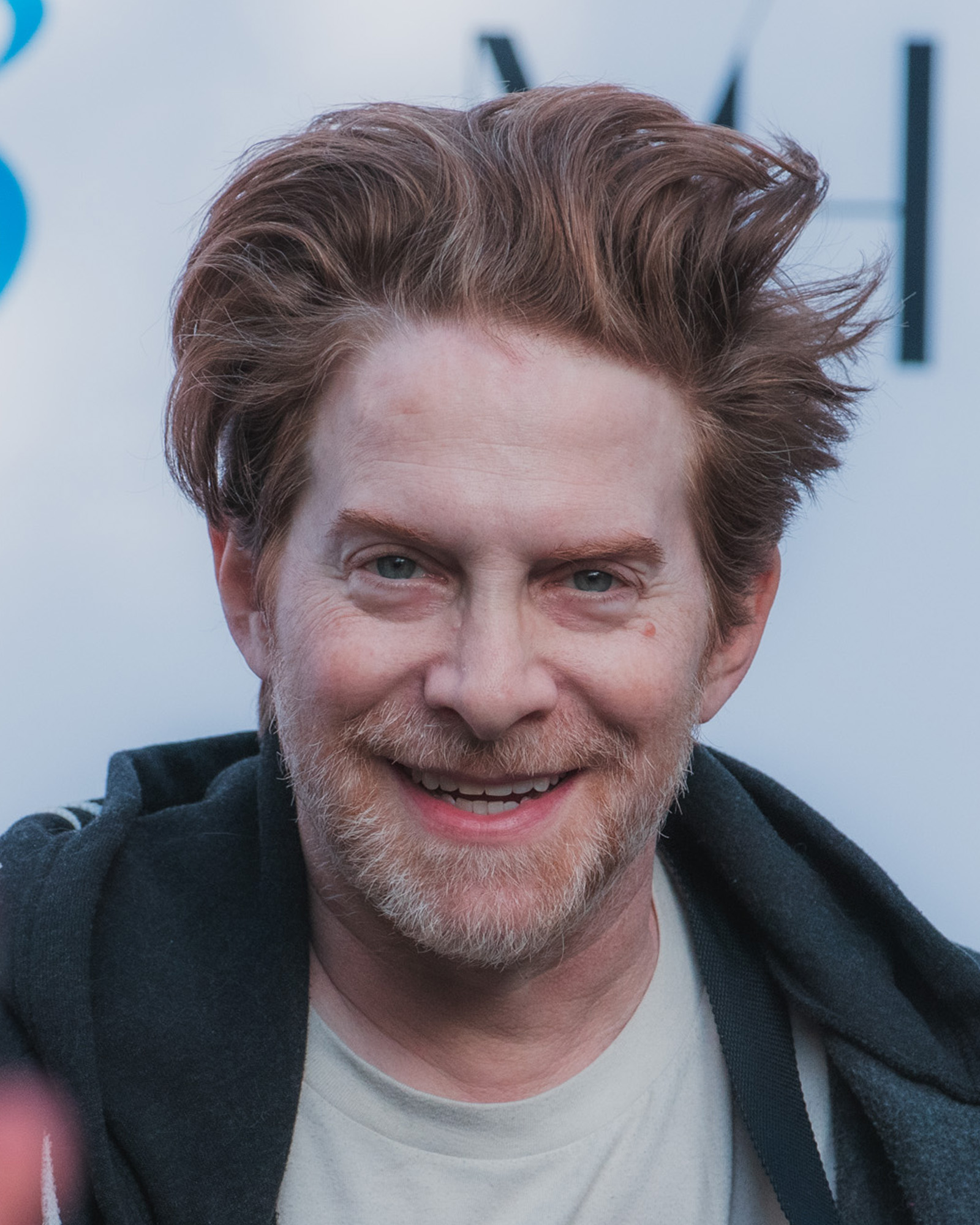
Seth Green

- Lisa Eichhorn—Reading
- Lisa Emery—Pittsburgh
- Charles Esten—Pittsburgh
- Patrick Fabian—Pittsburgh / New Cumberland
- Tina Fey—Upper Darby
- W.C. Fields—Philadelphia
- Larry Fine—Philadelphia
- Bette Ford—McKeesport
- Meg Foster—Reading
- Matthew Fox—Abington
- Jonathan Frakes—Bellefonte
- Martin Gabel—Philadelphia
- Megan Gallagher—Reading
- Kyle Gallner—West Chester
- Rita Gam—Pittsburgh
- Billy Gardell—Pittsburgh
- Janet Gaynor—Philadelphia
- Deborah Geffner—Pittsburgh
- Richard Gere—Philadelphia
- Ileen Getz—Bristol
- Shane Gillis—Mechanicsburg
- Todd Glass—Philadelphia
- Scott Glenn—Pittsburgh
- Jeff Goldblum—Pittsburgh
- Eve Gordon—Pittsburgh
- Frank Gorshin—Pittsburgh
- Seth Green—Philadelphia
- Charles Grodin—Pittsburgh
- Jonathan Groff—Lancaster

H–K

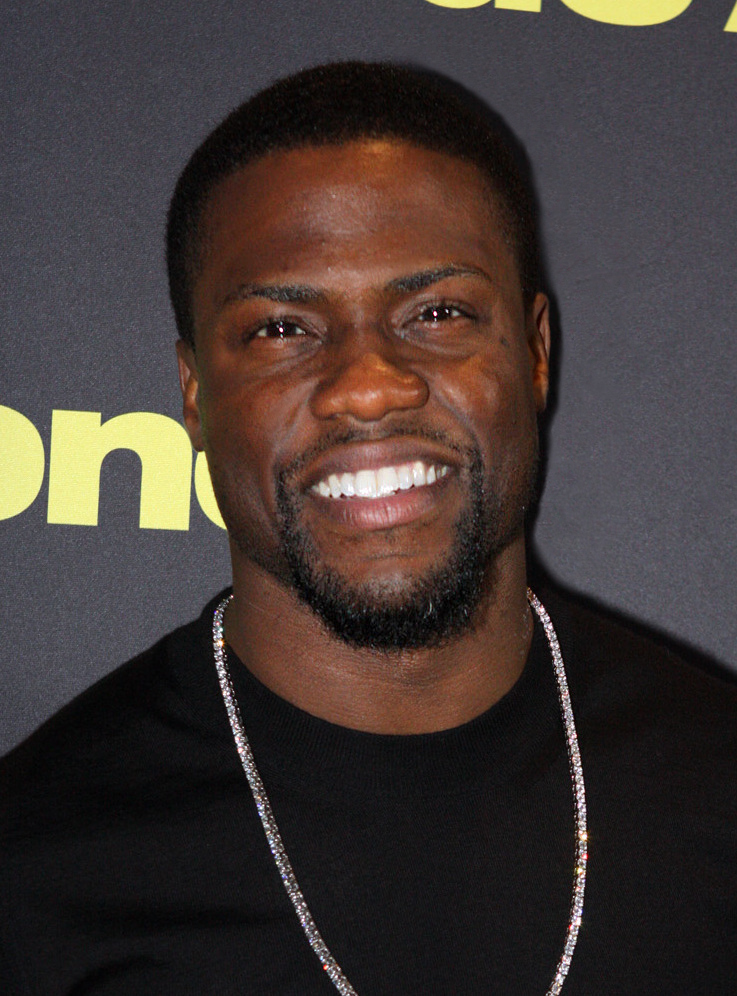
Kevin Hart

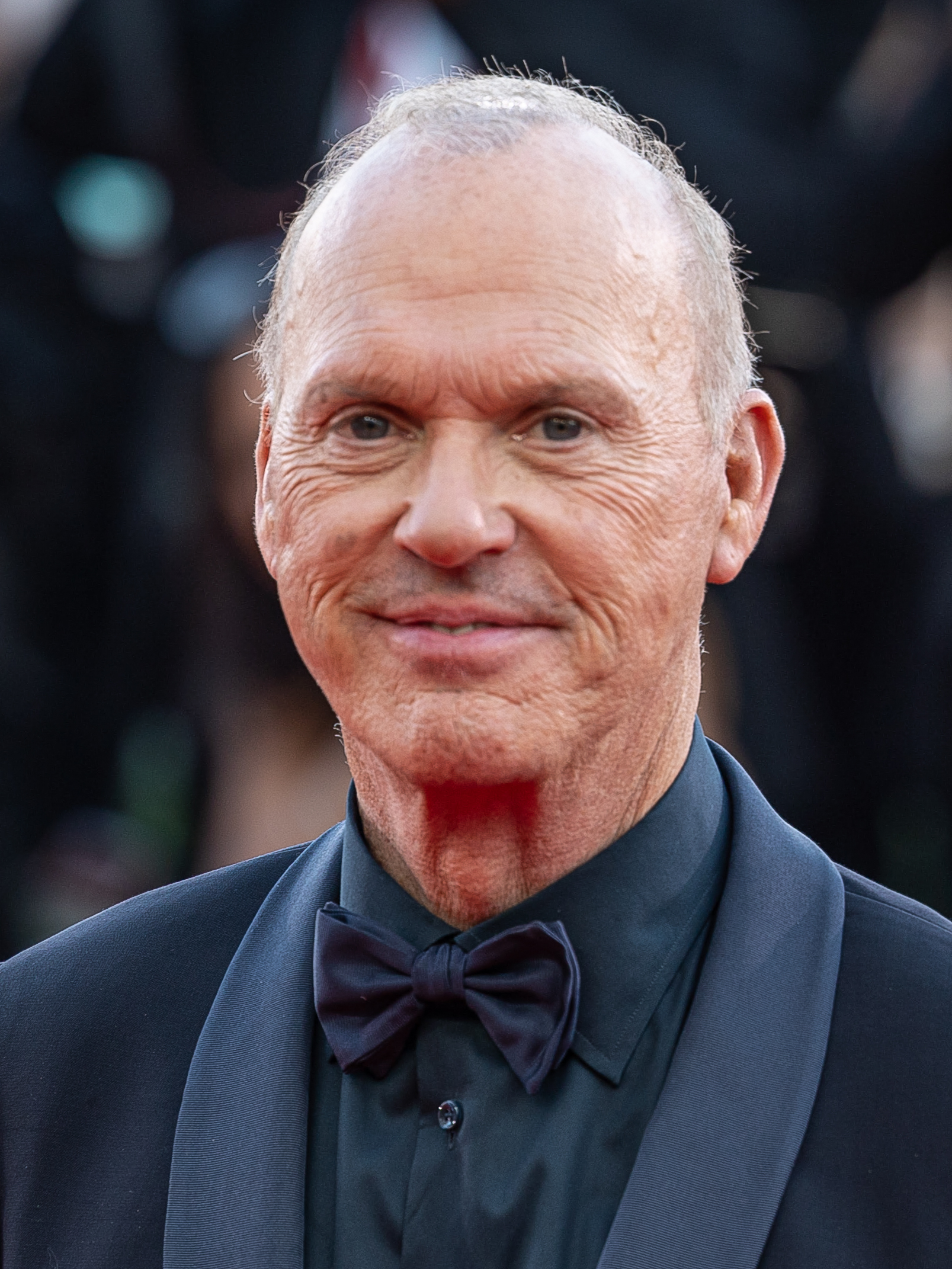
Michael Keaton

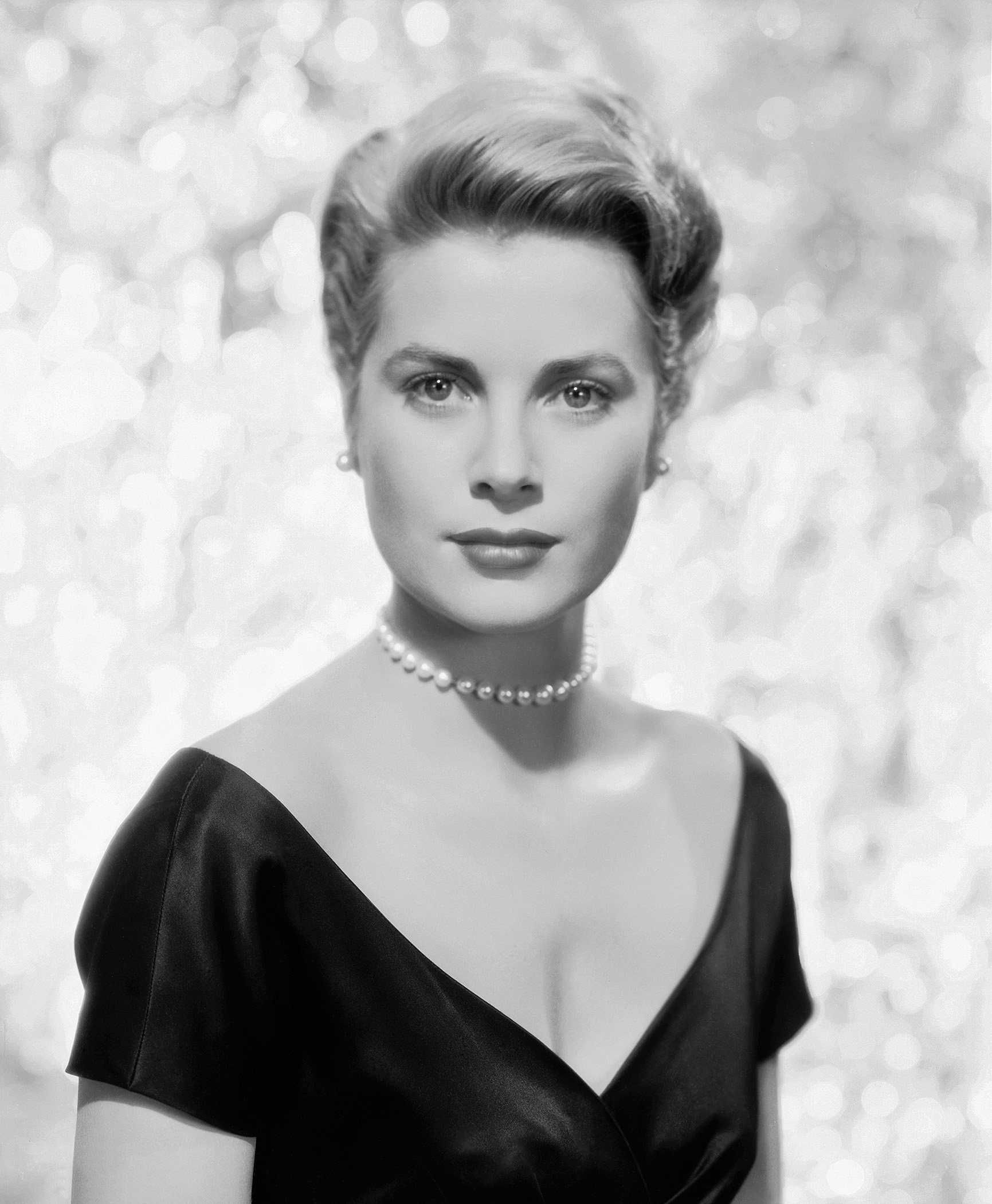
Grace Kelly

- Kevin Peter Hall—Pittsburgh
- Charles Hallahan—Philadelphia
- Veronica Hamel—Philadelphia
- Kevin Hart—Philadelphia
- Tim Heidecker—Allentown
- Sherman Hemsley—Philadelphia
- Lauren Holly—Bristol
- Jane Hajduk—Oil City
- Gillian Jacobs—Mt. Lebanon
- Anthony Jeselnik—Pittsburgh / Upper St. Clair
- Cherie Johnson—Pittsburgh
- Clark Johnson—Philadelphia
- Russell Johnson—Ashley
- Kendall Johnson—Lower Merion
- Johnny Jolin—Montoursville
- Angela Jones—Greensburg
- Shirley Jones—Charleroi
- Mario Joyner—Pittsburgh
- James Karen—Wilkes-Barre
- JP Karliak—Scranton
- Tim Kazurinsky—Johnstown
- Staci Keanan—Devon
- Michael Keaton—Pittsburgh
- Sheila Kelley—Greensburg
- Gene Kelly—Pittsburgh
- Grace Kelly (Princess of Monaco)—Philadelphia
- Michael Kelly—Philadelphia
- Jamie Kennedy—Upper Darby
- Rya Kihlstedt—Lancaster
- Daniel Dae Kim—Bethlehem
- Taylor Kinney—Lancaster
- Jack Klugman—Philadelphia
- Eddie Korbich—Shamokin
- Harley Jane Kozak—Wilkes-Barre
- Nancy Kulp—Miffilintown
- Jack Krizmanich—Phoenixville

L–M

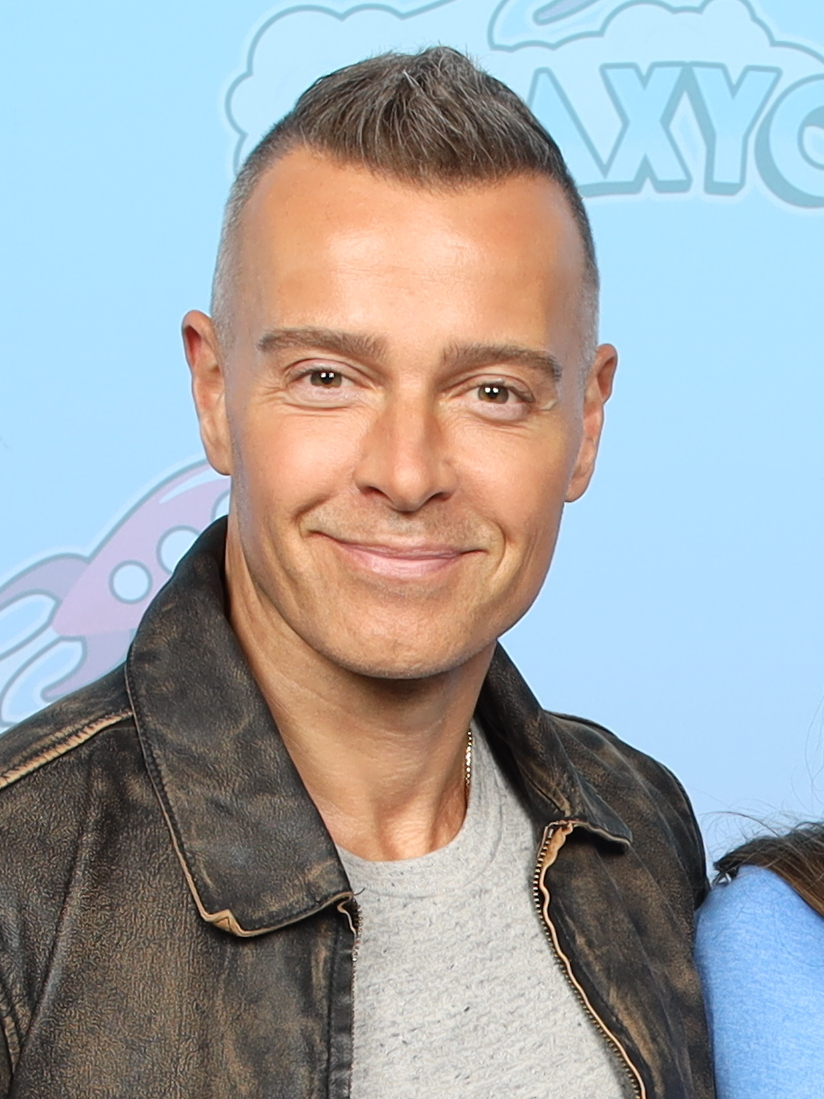
Joey Lawrence

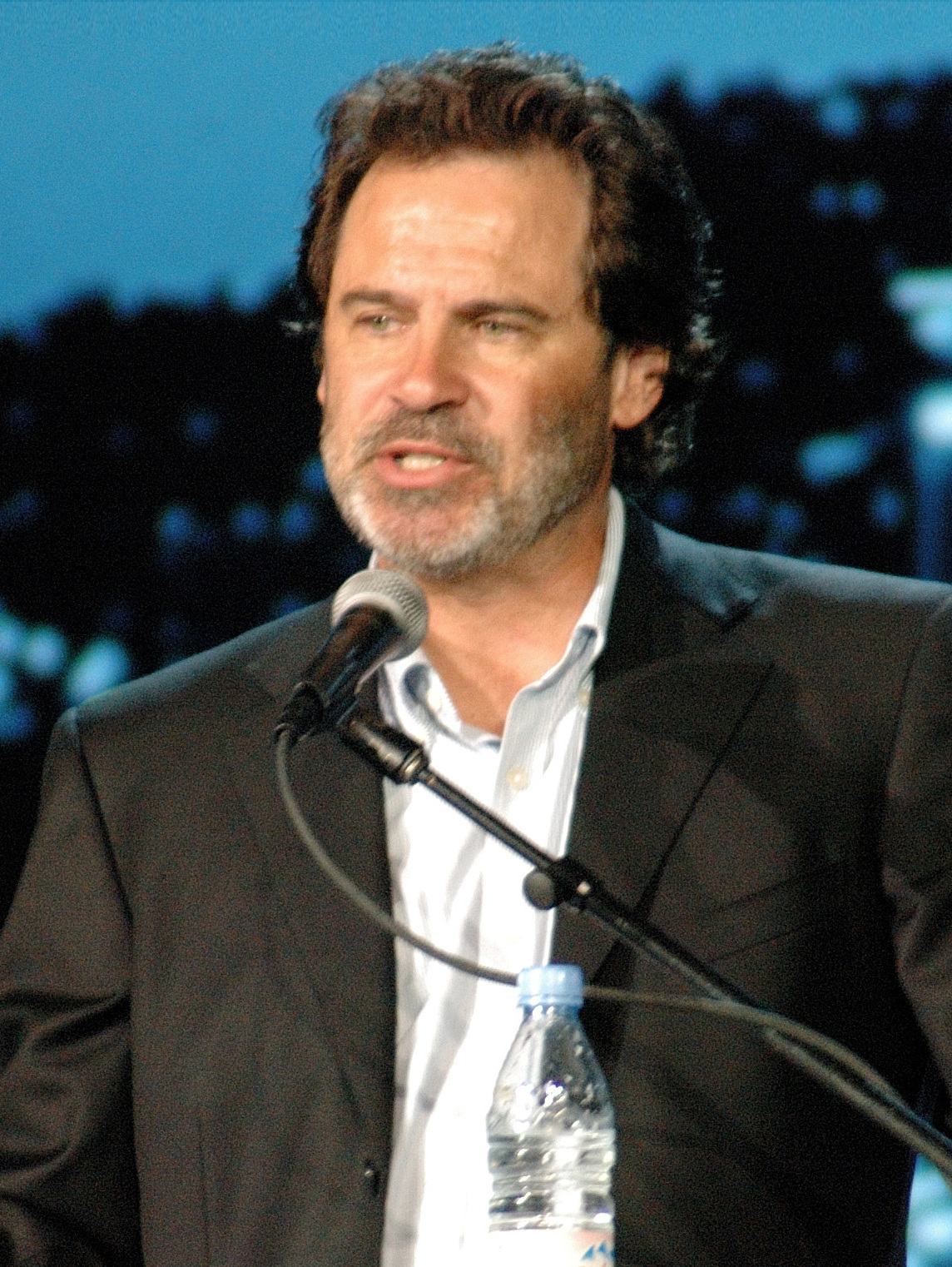
Dennis Miller

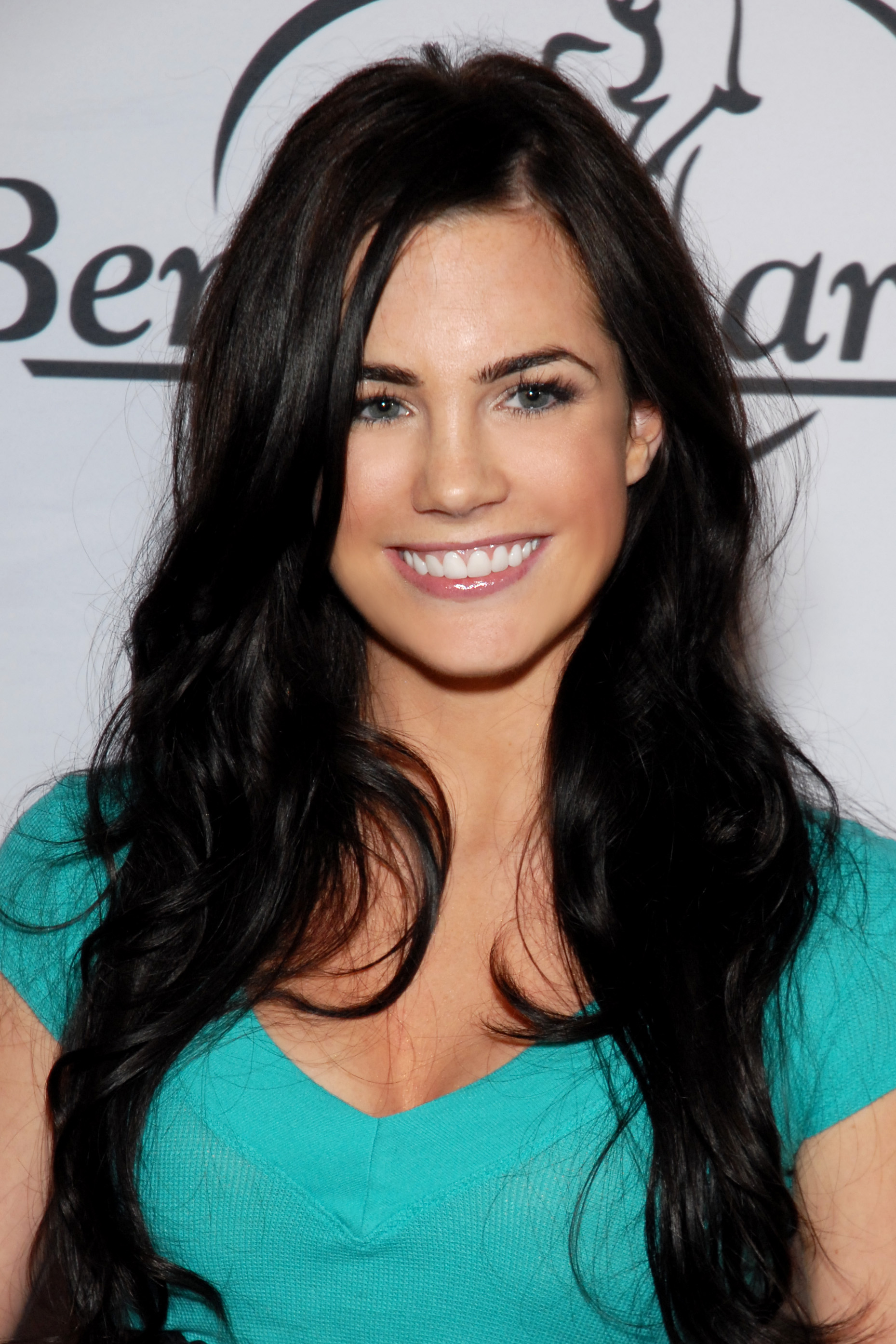
Jillian Murray

- Liz Larsen—Philadelphia
- Andrew Lawrence—Philadelphia
- Joey Lawrence—Philadelphia
- Matthew Lawrence—Abington Township
- Joshua Leonard—State College
- Richard LeParmentier—Pittsburgh
- David Lewis—Philadelphia
- Gilbert Lewis—Philadelphia
- Heather Lind—Upland
- Jonathan Loughran—Philadelphia
- Beverly Lynne—Sellersville
- Jeanette MacDonald—Philadelphia
- Aline MacMahon—Pittsburgh
- Connor Maloney—Harrisburg
- Joe Manganiello—Pittsburgh / Mt. Lebanon
- Jayne Mansfield—Bryn Mawr
- Bam Margera—West Chester
- Mark Margolis—Philadelphia
- Hugh Marlowe—Philadelphia
- Adoni Maropis—Pittsburgh
- Joe Maross—Barnesboro
- Lynne Marta—Philadelphia
- Kiel Martin—Pittsburgh
- Al Martino—Philadelphia
- Eric Martsolf—Harrisburg
- Jackie Mason—Latrobe
- Mark Matkevich—Philadelphia
- Elaine May—Philadelphia
- Melanie Mayron—Philadelphia
- Mitzi McCall—Pittsburgh
- Brooke McCarter—Philadelphia
- Paul McCrane—Philadelphia / Richboro
- Mary McDonnell—Wilkes-Barre
- Rob McElhenney—Philadelphia
- Matthew McGrory—West Chester
- Frank McHugh—Allegheny County
- Kate McNeil—Philadelphia
- Larry Mendte—Lansdowne
- Adolphe Menjou—Pittsburgh
- Charles Meredith—Knoxville
- James A Michener—Doylestown
- Kate Micucci—Nazareth
- Vic Mignogna—Pittsburgh
- R. A. Mihailoff—Titusville
- Dennis Miller—Pittsburgh
- Jason Miller—Scranton
- Lara Jill Miller—Allentown
- Kristin Minter—Yardley
- Cameron Mitchell—Dallastown
- Tom Mix—Mix Run
- Katherine Moennig—Philadelphia
- Kelly Monaco—Philadelphia
- Pauline Moore—Harrisburg
- Jillian Murray—Reading

N–R

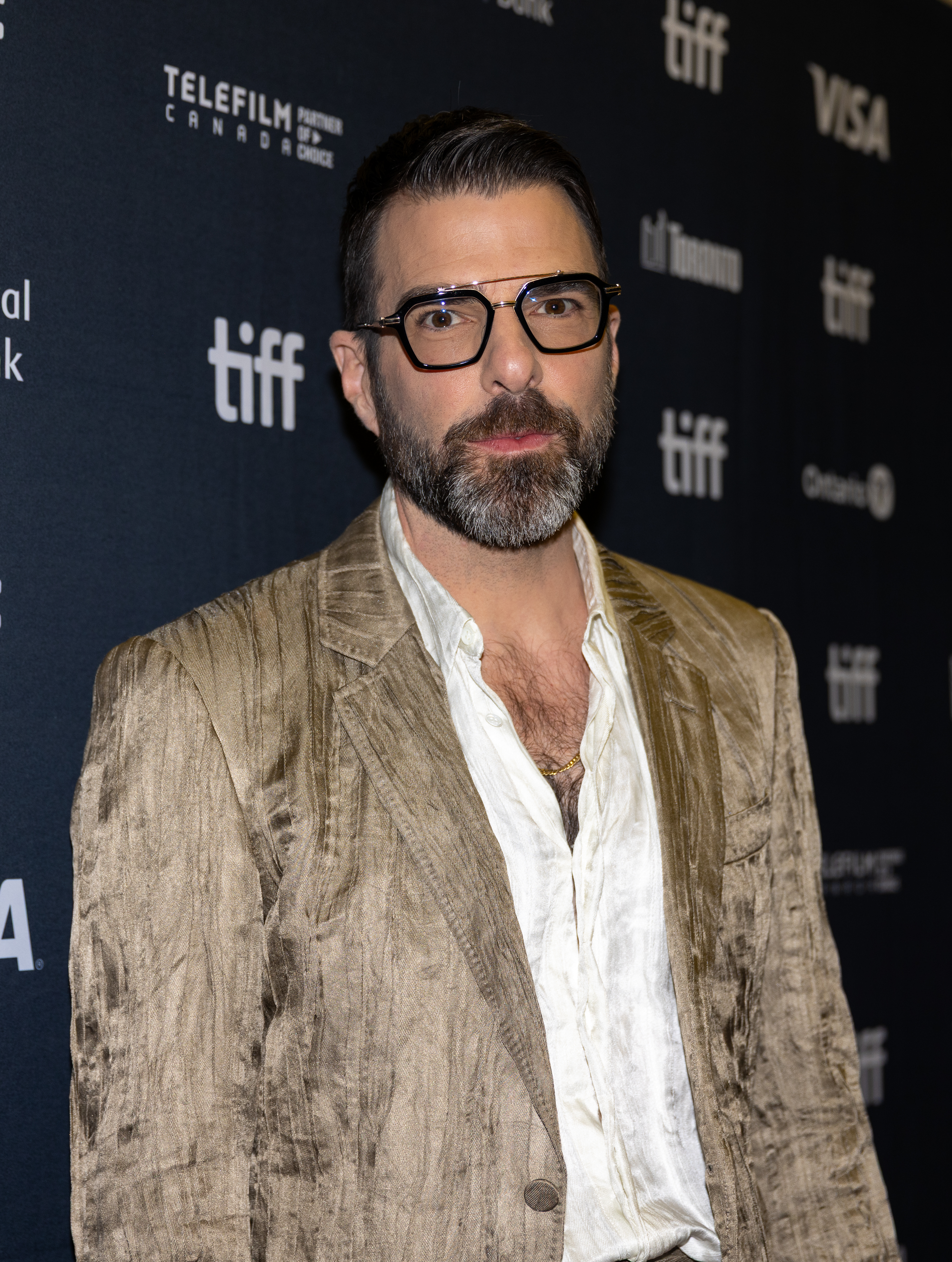
Zachary Quinto

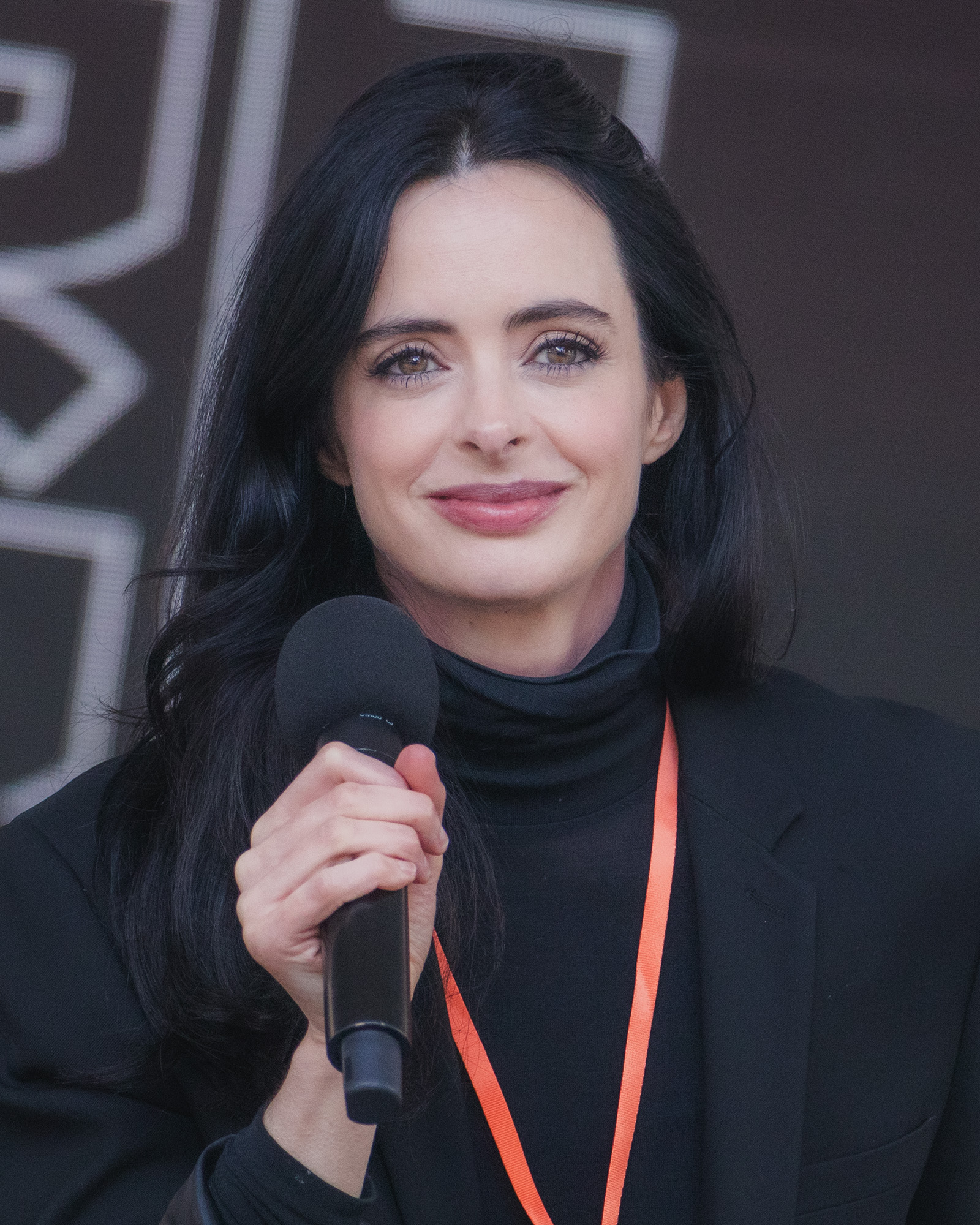
Krysten Ritter

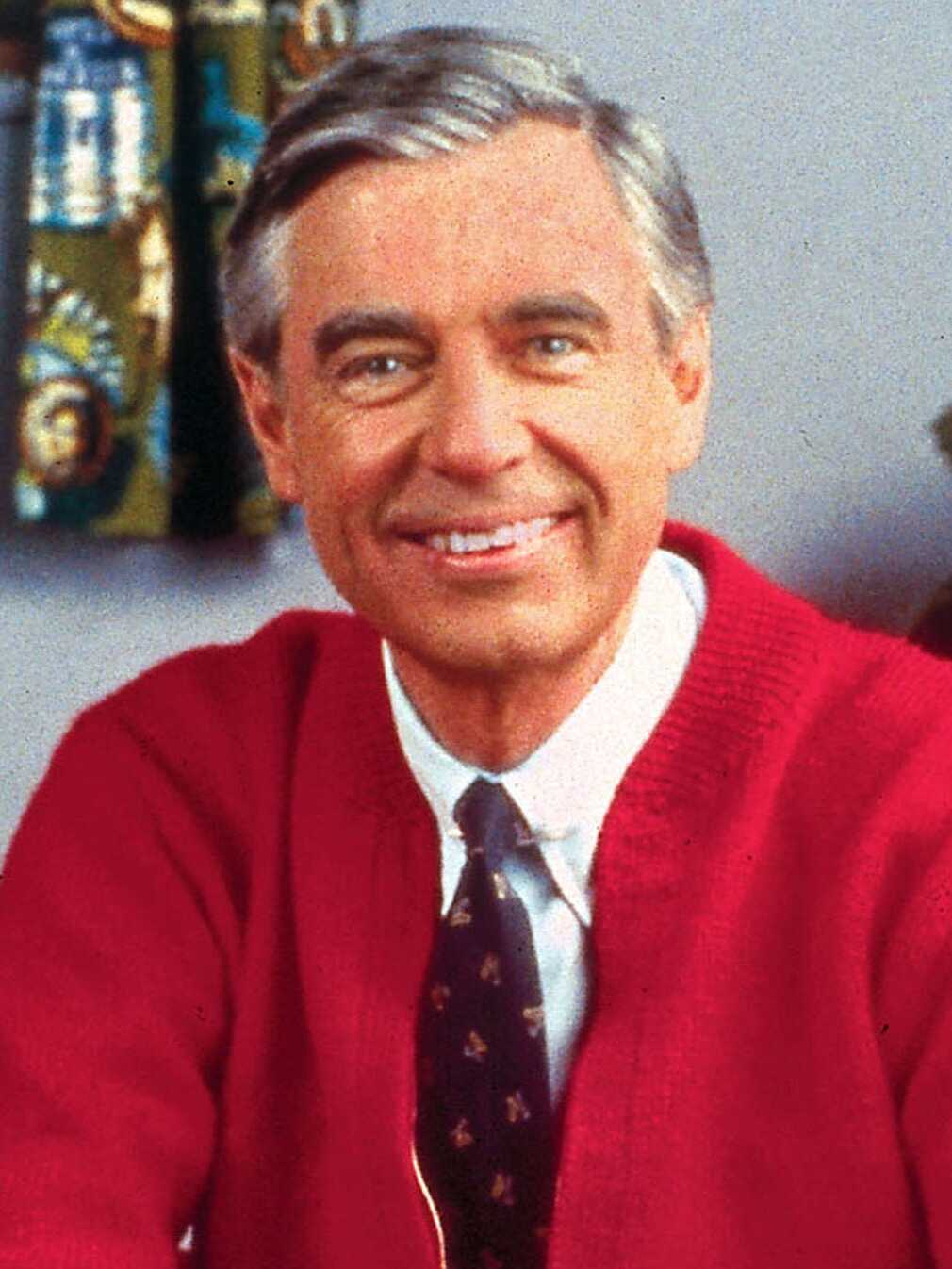
Fred Rogers

- Kelly Neal—Philadelphia
- Irene Ng—Allentown
- Greg Nicotero—Pittsburgh
- J. J. North—Philadelphia
- Jay Oakerson—Philadelphia
- Cheri Oteri—Upper Darby
- Jerry Orbach—Wilkes-Barre
- Beth Ostrosky—Pittsburgh
- Jack Palance—Hazle Township
- Stuart Pankin—Philadelphia
- Sydney Park—Philadelphia
- Adrian Pasdar—Powelton Village
- Steven Pasquale—Hershey
- Michele Pawk—Butler
- Pamela Payton-Wright—Pittsburgh
- Kelly Perine—State College
- Robert Picardo—Philadelphia
- Pink (Alecia Moore)—Doylestown
- Joel Polis—Philadelphia
- Jon Polito—Philadelphia
- Billy Porter—Pittsburgh
- William Powell—Pittsburgh
- Robert Prosky—Philadelphia
- Zachary Quinto—Pittsburgh
- James Rebhorn—Philadelphia
- Krysten Ritter—Bloomsburg/Shickshinny
- Erica Rivera—Philadelphia
- Keith Robinson—Philadelphia
- Holly Robinson-Peete—Philadelphia
- Daniel Roebuck—Bethlehem
- Fred Rogers—Latrobe
- George A. Romero—Pittsburgh
- Norman Rose—Philadelphia
- Zelda Rubinstein—Pittsburgh
- Herbert Rudley—Philadelphia

S–Z

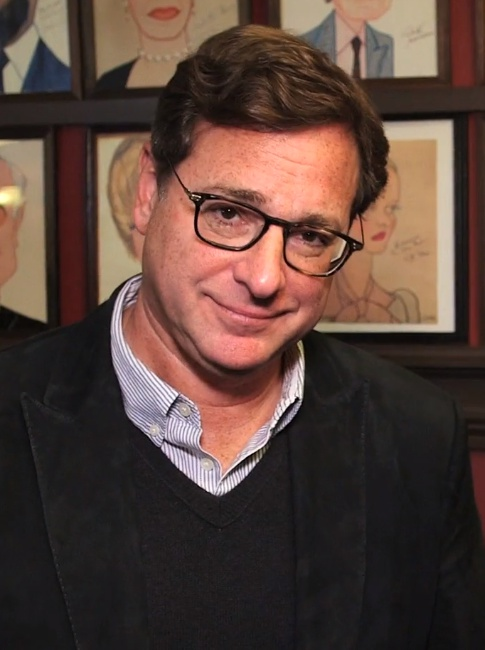
Bob Saget

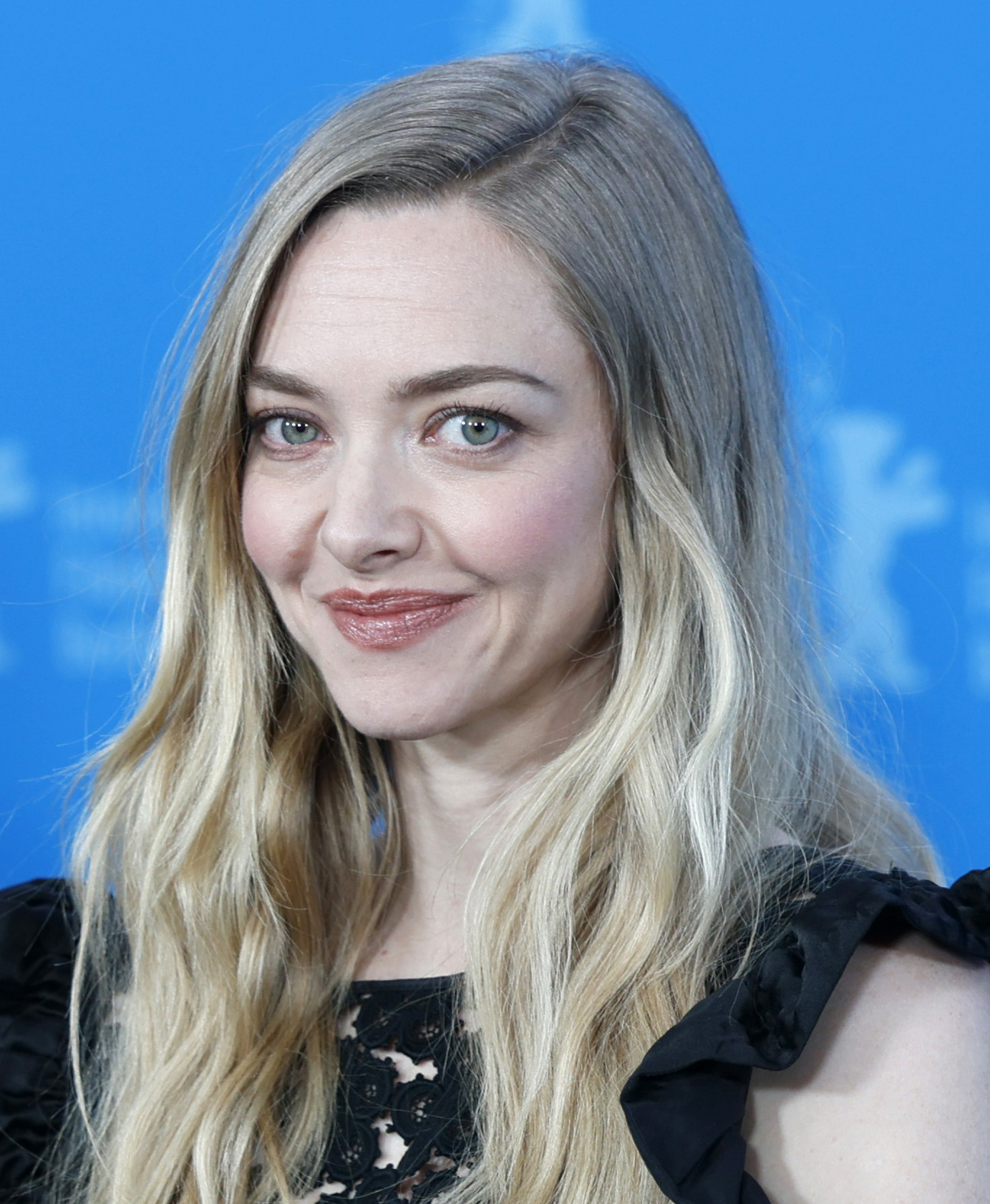
Amanda Seyfried

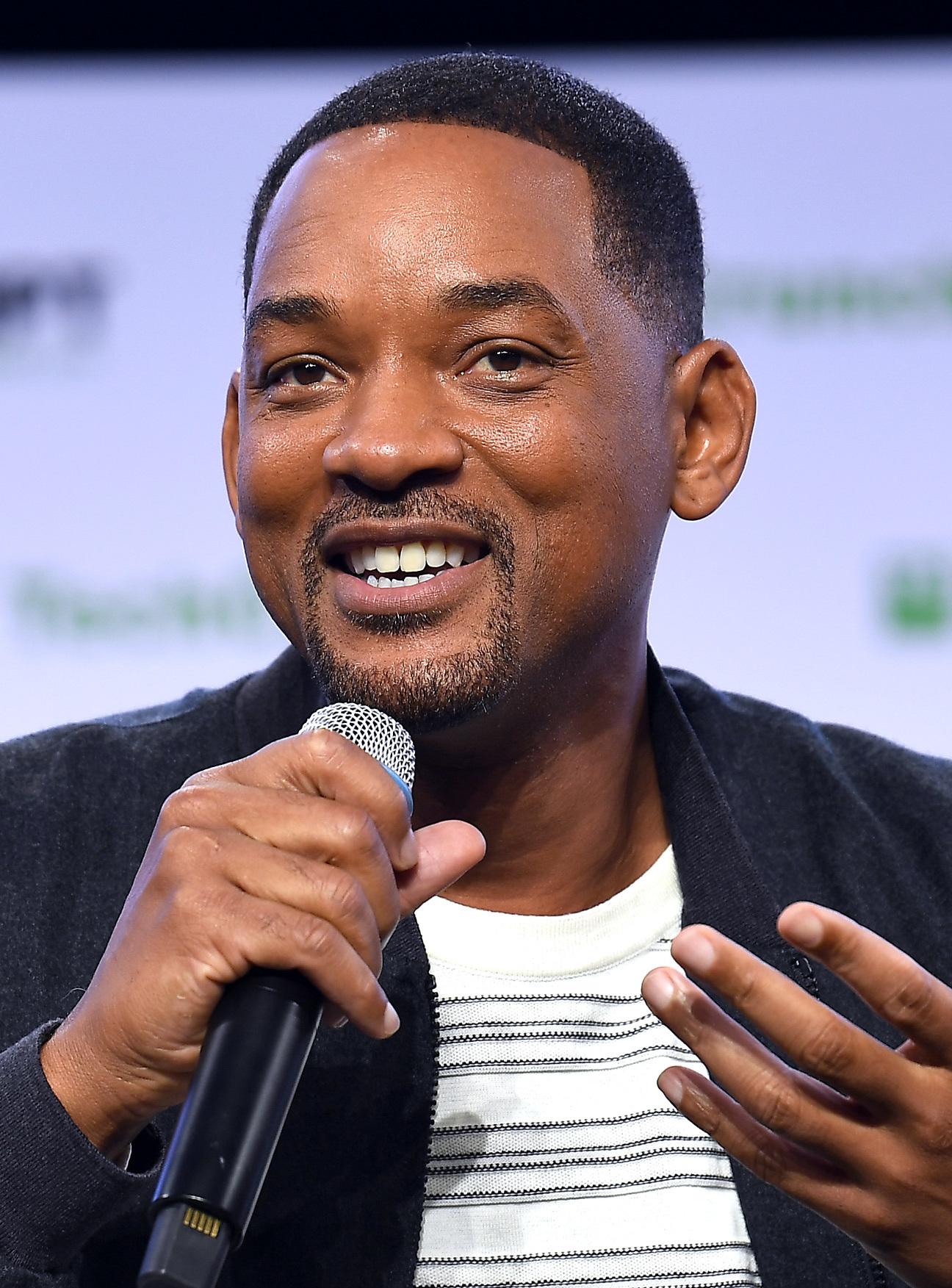
Will Smith

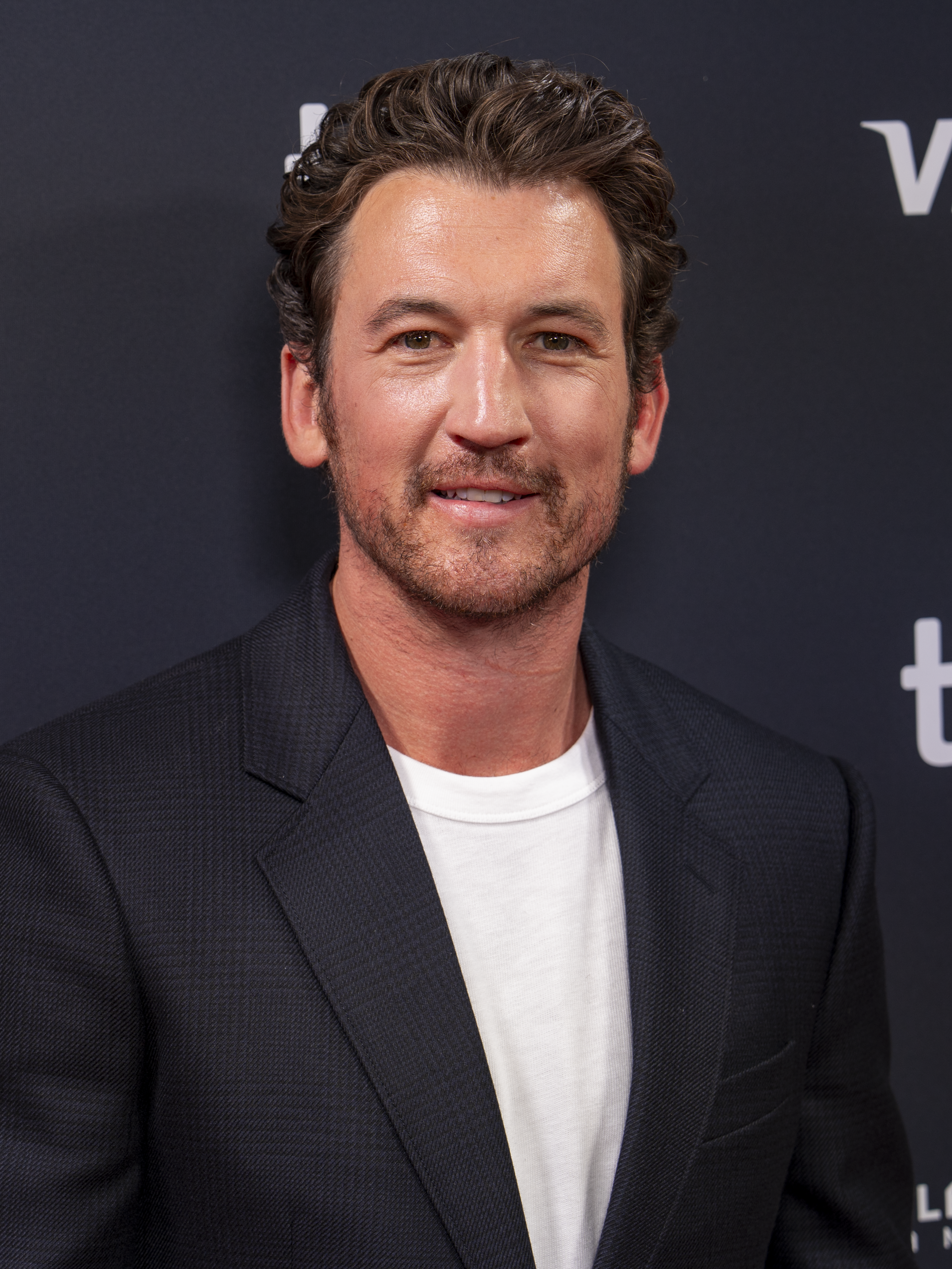
Miles Teller

- Bob Saget—Philadelphia
- Diane Salinger—Philadelphia
- Richard Sanders—Harrisburg
- Tom Savini—Pittsburgh
- Jennifer Sciole—Philadelphia
- Lizabeth Scott—Scranton
- David O. Selznick—Pittsburgh
- Amanda Seyfried—Allentown
- Craig Sheffer—York
- M. Night Shyamalan—Philadelphia
- Penny Singleton—Philadelphia
- Johnny Sins—Pittsburgh
- Emil Sitka—Johnstown
- Jonathan Slavin—Wilkes-Barre
- Kerr Smith—Exton
- Will Smith—Philadelphia
- Dana Snyder—Allentown
- Timothy Stack—Doylestown
- Robert Sterling—New Castle
- James Stewart—Indiana
- Sharon Stone—Meadville area
- Joseph Sweeney—Philadelphia
- Taylor Swift—West Reading
- Christine Taylor—Allentown
- Holland Taylor—Philadelphia
- Teller—Philadelphia
- Miles Teller—Downingtown
- Jonathan Taylor Thomas—Bethlehem
- Paul F. Tompkins—Philadelphia
- William Tracy—Pittsburgh
- Tom Verica—Philadelphia
- Mike Vogel—Abington/Warminster
- Brendon Walsh—Philadelphia
- Lisa Waltz—Limerick
- Eric Wareheim—Audubon
- Fritz Weaver—Pittsburgh
- Michael Willis—Lancaster
- Thomas F. Wilson—Philadelphia/Wayne
- Danny Woodburn—Philadelphia
- Chris Young—Chambersburg
- Winter Ave Zoli—New Hope

== Artists ==
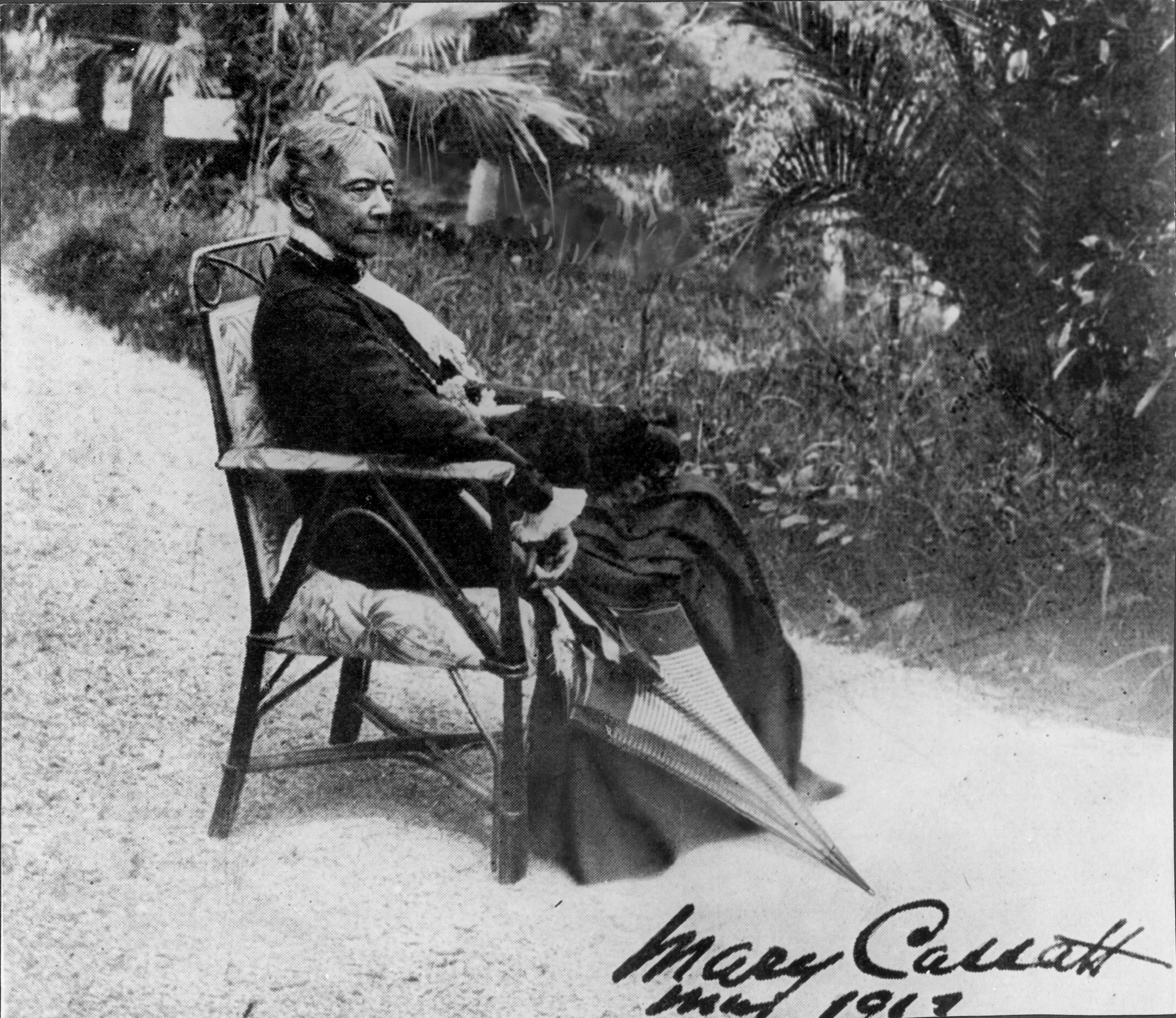
Mary Cassatt

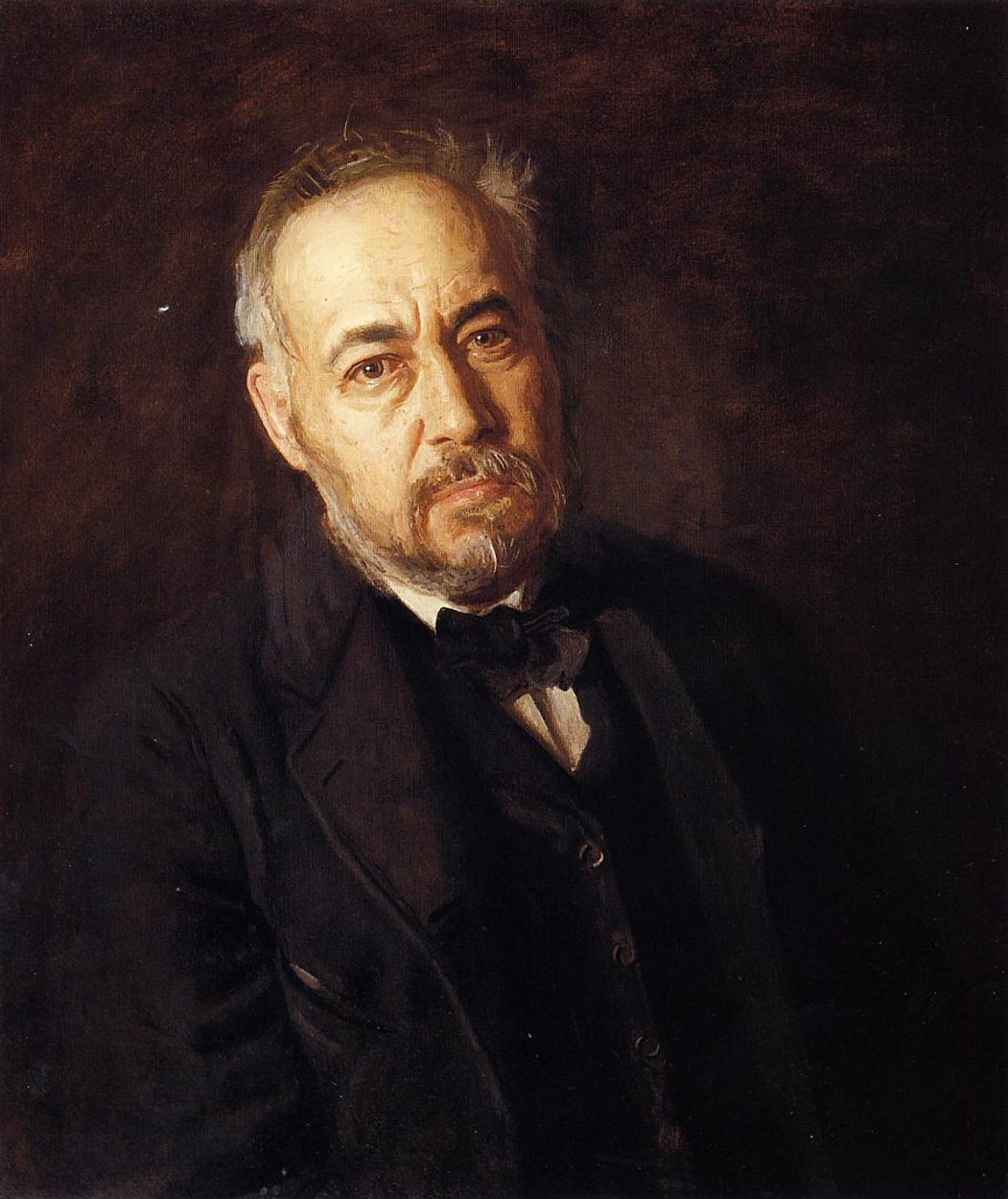
Thomas Eakins

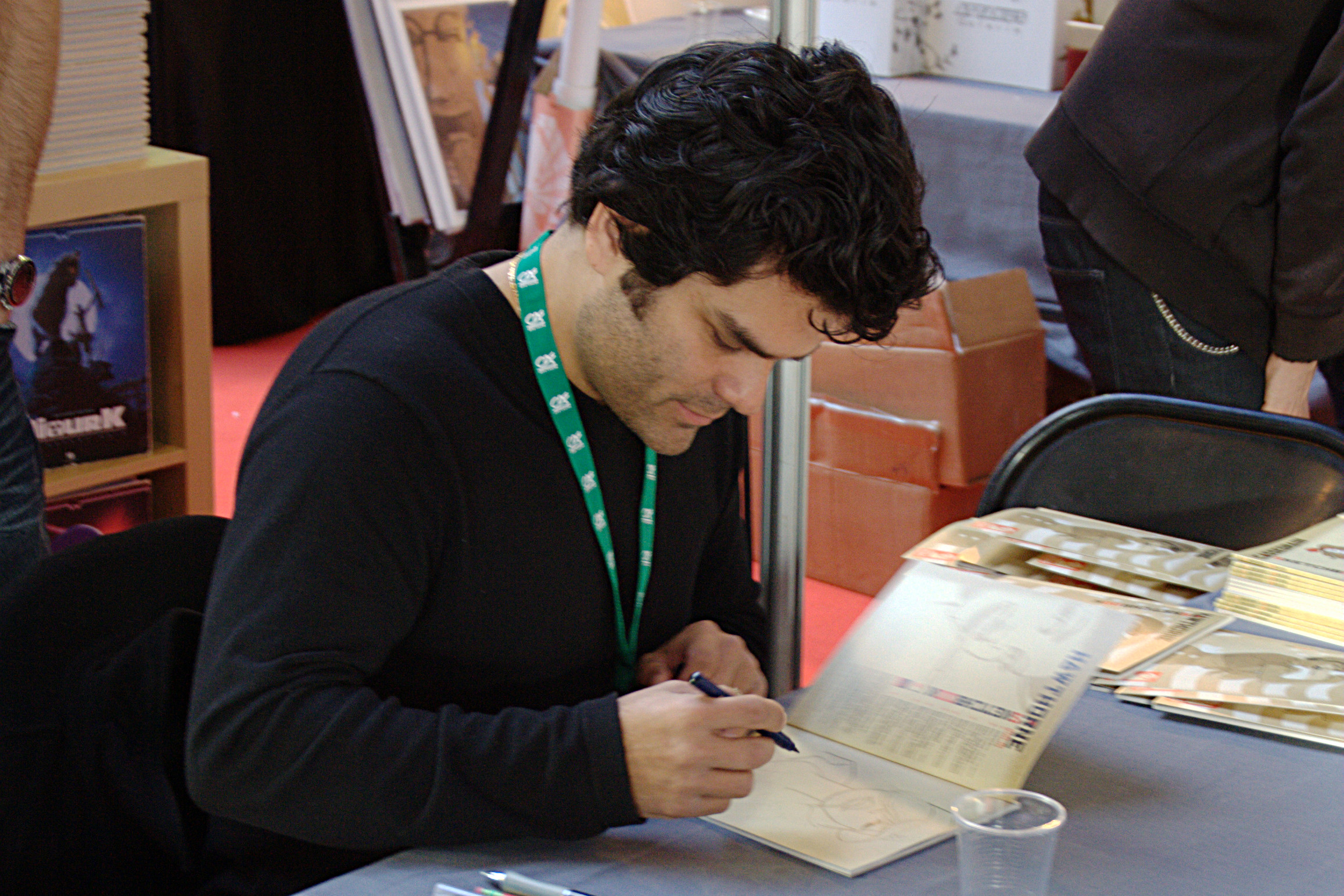
Mike Hawthorne

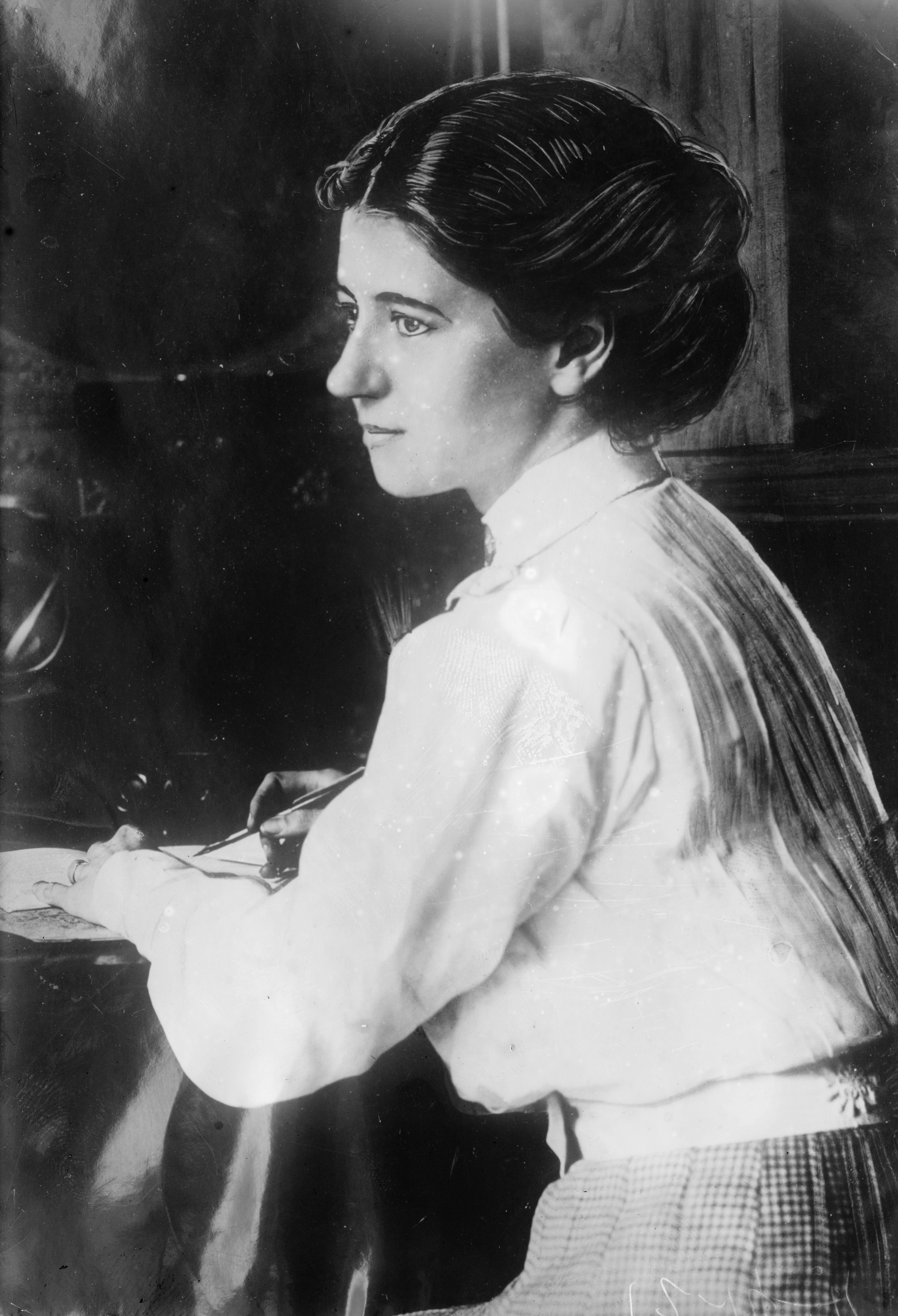
Violet Oakley

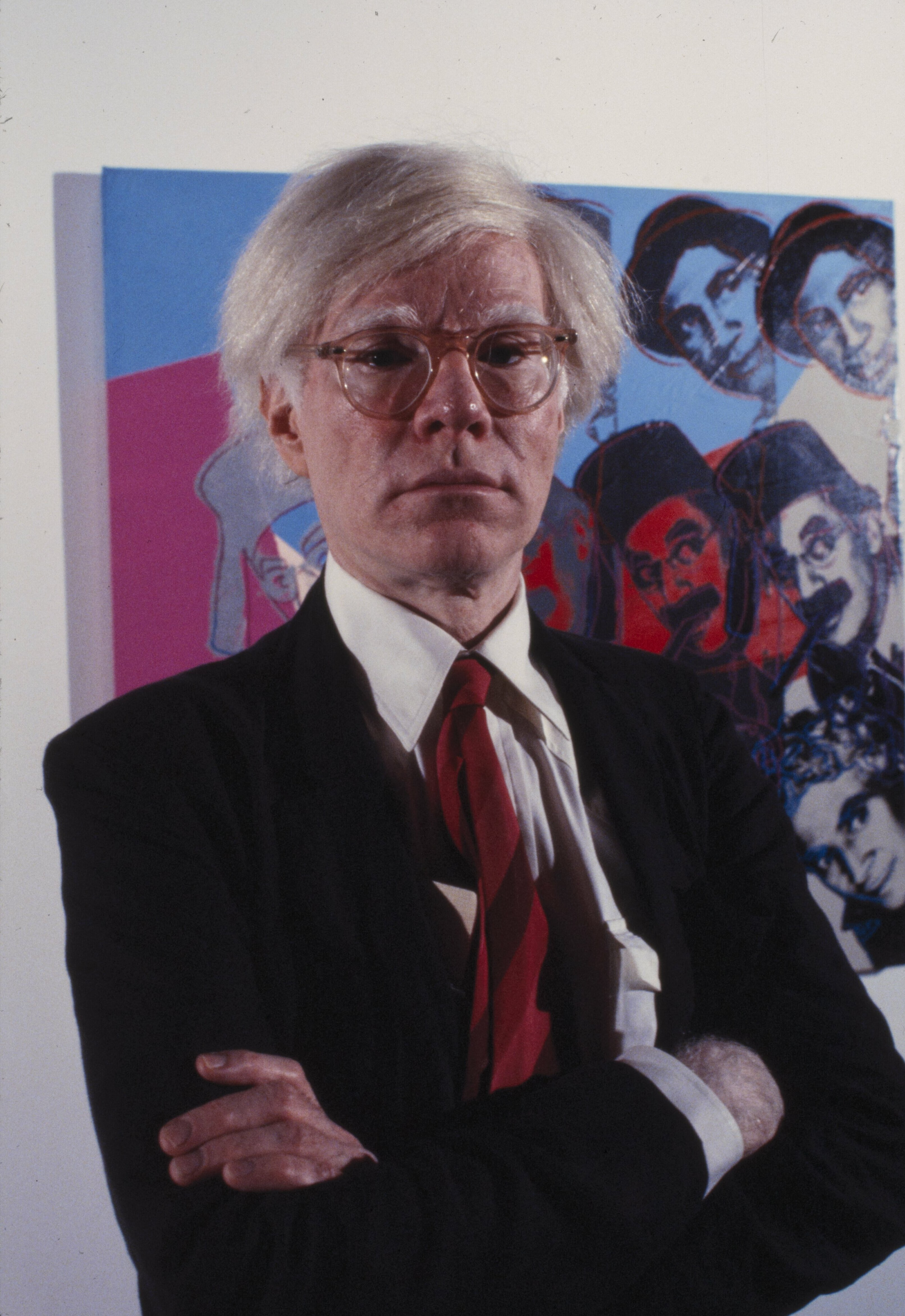
Andy Warhol

- Julian Abele, architect—Philadelphia
- Alice Aycock, sculptor—Harrisburg
- Edmund Bacon, architect—Philadelphia
- Paul Bartholomew, architect—Ligonier
- Karen Bausman, architect—Allentown
- Jonathan Bean, illustrator—Fleetwood
- Alison Bechdel, graphic novelist—Beech Creek
- Cecilia Beaux, painter—Philadelphia
- Alexander Calder, sculptor—Lawnton
- Mary Cassatt, painter—Allegheny City
- George Catlin, painter—Wilkes-Barre
- Stuart Davis, painter—Philadelphia
- Charles Demuth, painter—Lancaster
- Steve Ditko, comic book artist—Johnstown
- Thomas Eakins, painter—Philadelphia
- William Glackens, painter—Philadelphia
- Martha Graham, modern dancer and choreographer—Allegheny City
- Keith Haring, painter—Kutztown
- Jerry Harris, sculptor—Pittsburgh
- William Stanley Haseltine, painter—Philadelphia
- Mike Hawthorne, comic book artist, illustrator—York
- Martin Johnson Heade, painter—Lumberville
- Charleen Kinser, toy-designer—Boalsburg
- Gelsey Kirkland, ballerina—Bethlehem
- Franz Kline, painter—Wilkes-Barre
- Jeff Koons, sculptor—York
- Nate Lewis, visual artist—Beaver Falls
- Thaddeus Mosley, sculptor—Pittsburgh
- Alice Neel, painter—Colwyn
- Violet Oakley, painter—Philadelphia
- Maxfield Parrish, illustrator—Philadelphia
- Philip Pearlstein, painter—Pittsburgh
- Joseph Pennell, illustrator—Philadelphia
- Man Ray, artist and photographer—Philadelphia
- Sue Reno, fiber artist–Pittsburgh
- Charles Sheeler, painter, photographer—Philadelphia
- Grover Simcox, illustrator—Philadelphia
- John Sloan, painter—Lock Haven
- Gary Mark Smith, global street photographer—Kutztown
- Jeff Smith, cartoonist—McKees Rocks
- Thomas Ustick Walter, architect—Philadelphia
- Andy Warhol, pop culture artist—Pittsburgh
- Neil Welliver, landscape artist—Millville
- Andrew Wyeth, painter—Chadds Ford Township
- Jamie Wyeth, painter (son of Andrew)—Chadds Ford Township
- N.C. Wyeth, illustrator (father of Andrew)—Chadds Ford Township
- Bunny Yeager, photographer—Wilkinsburg

== Astronauts ==
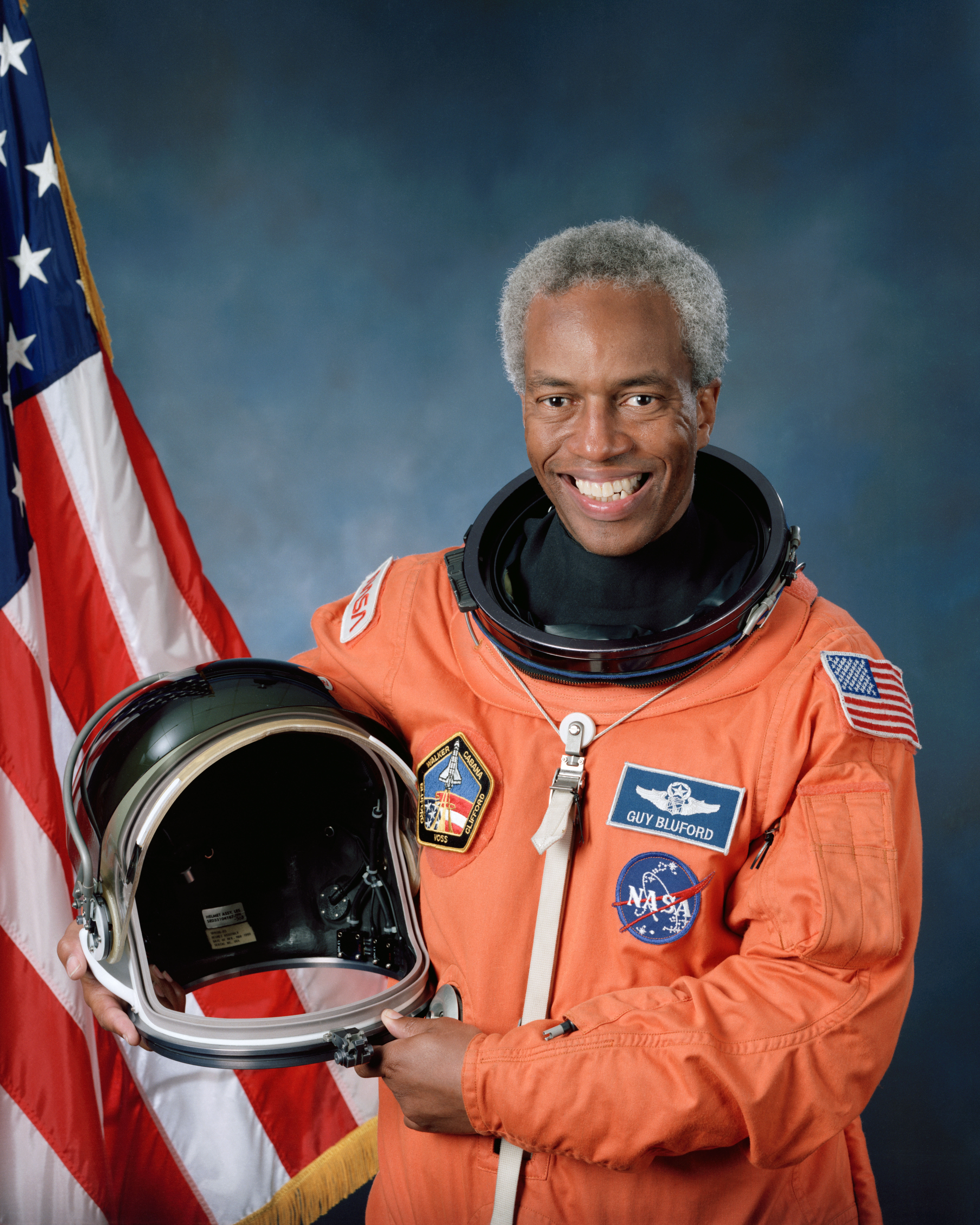
Guion Bluford

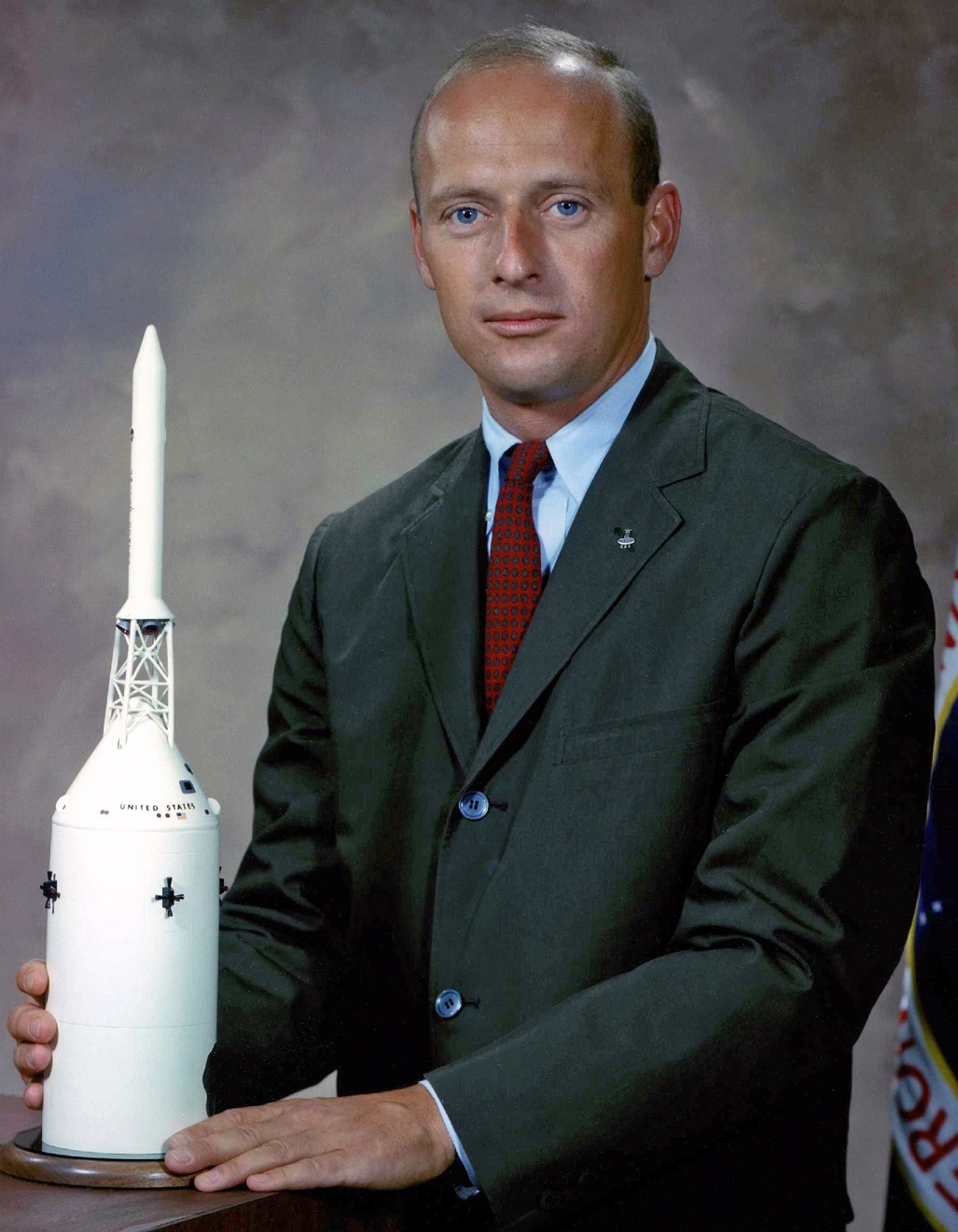
Pete Conrad

- Jerome Apt, NASA astronaut—Pittsburgh
- Guion S. Bluford, astronaut, first African-American man in space—Philadelphia
- Pete Conrad, Gemini, Apollo, and Skylab astronaut, third man to walk on the Moon—Philadelphia
- Michael Fincke—Pittsburgh
- Theodore Freeman, Group 3 astronaut; killed in training jet accident—Haverford
- Terry Hart, NASA astronaut—Pittsburgh
- James Irwin, Apollo 15—Pittsburgh
- Glynn Lunney, NASA engineer—Old Forge
- David Medved, trained astronaut and physicist—Philadelphia
- Paul W. Richards, Shuttle and ISS astronaut—Dunmore
- Patricia Hilliard Robertson, 1998 Astronaut Group; killed in private airplane accident—Indiana
- Daniel M. Tani, engineer, NASA astronaut—Ridley Park
- Joseph A. Walker, USAF/NASA astronaut, United States' seventh man in space—Washington, Pennsylvania
- Paul J. Weitz, Skylab and Shuttle astronaut—Erie

== Athletes ==
A–B | C–D | E–G | H–K | L–M | N–R | S–Z

"HOF" = Hall of Fame

A–B

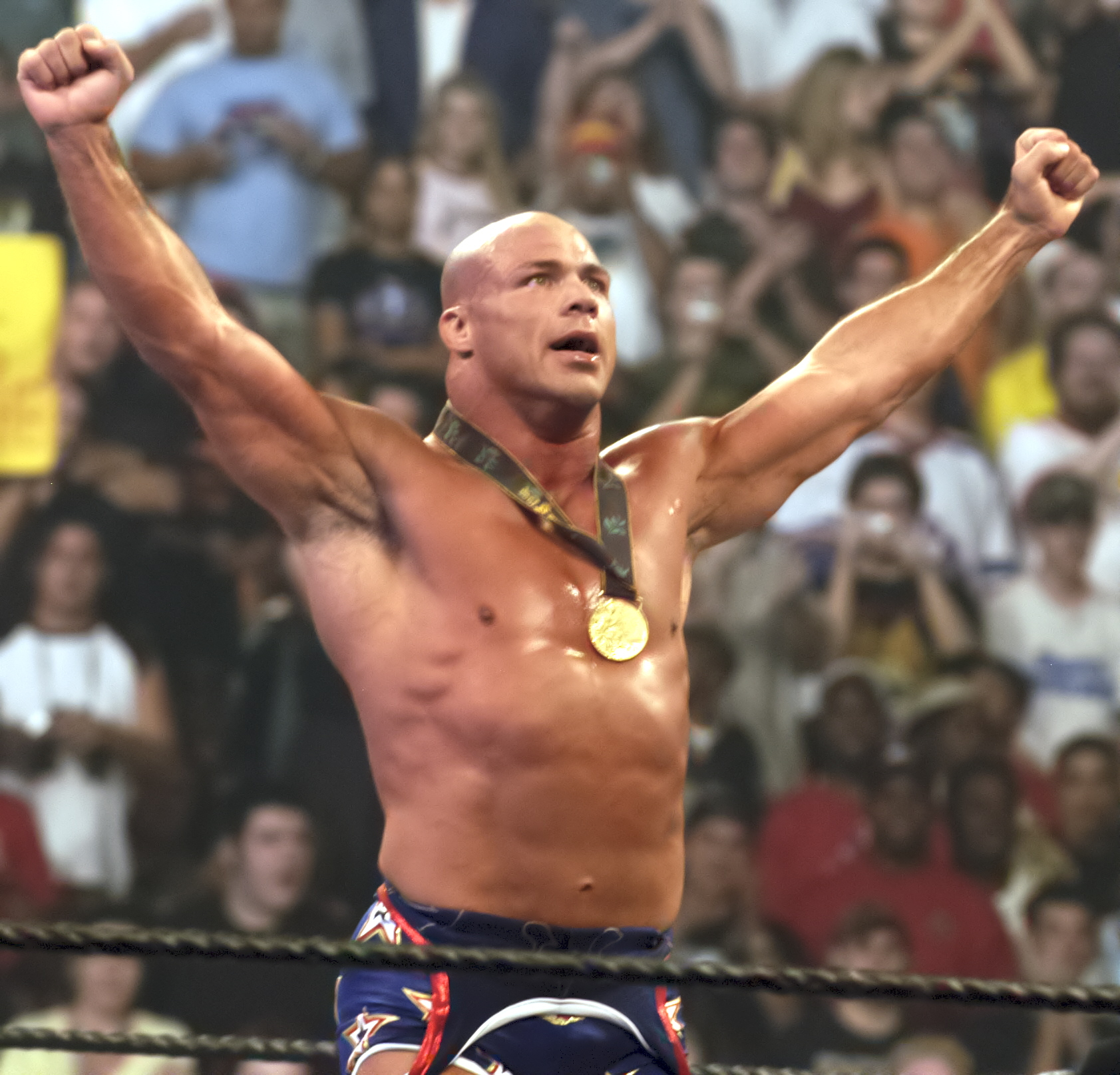
Kurt Angle

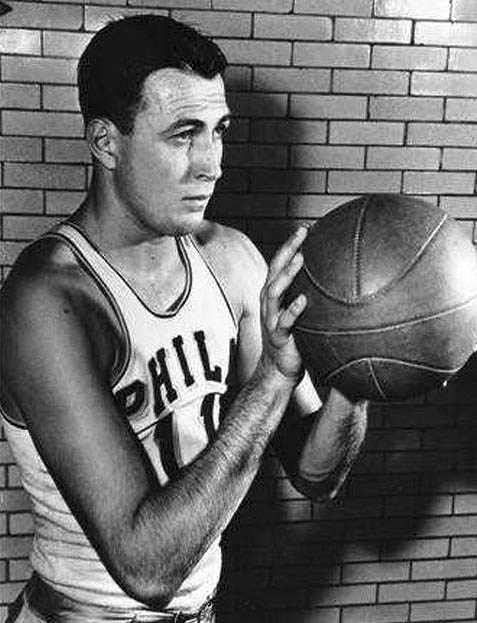
Paul Arizin

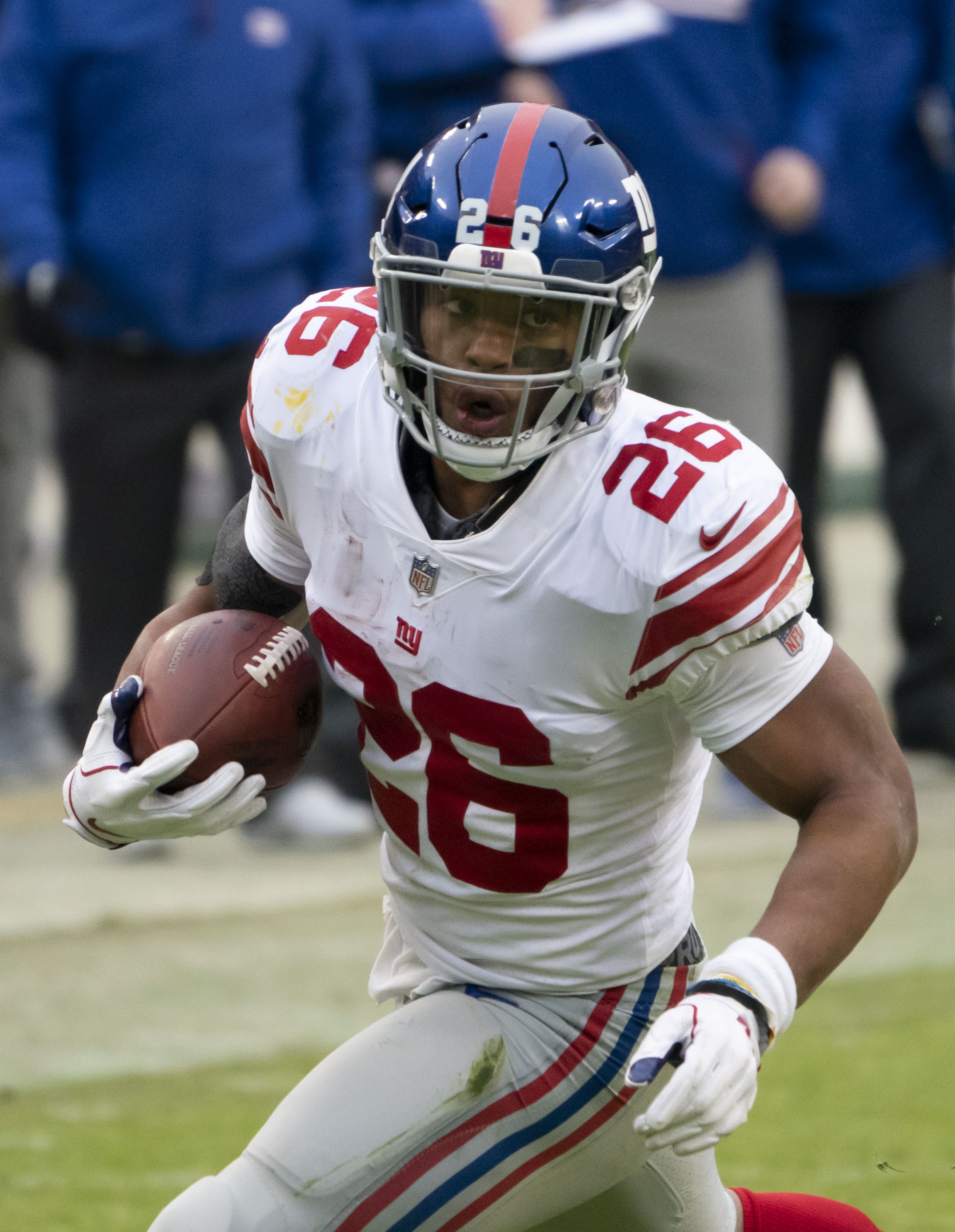
Saquon Barkley

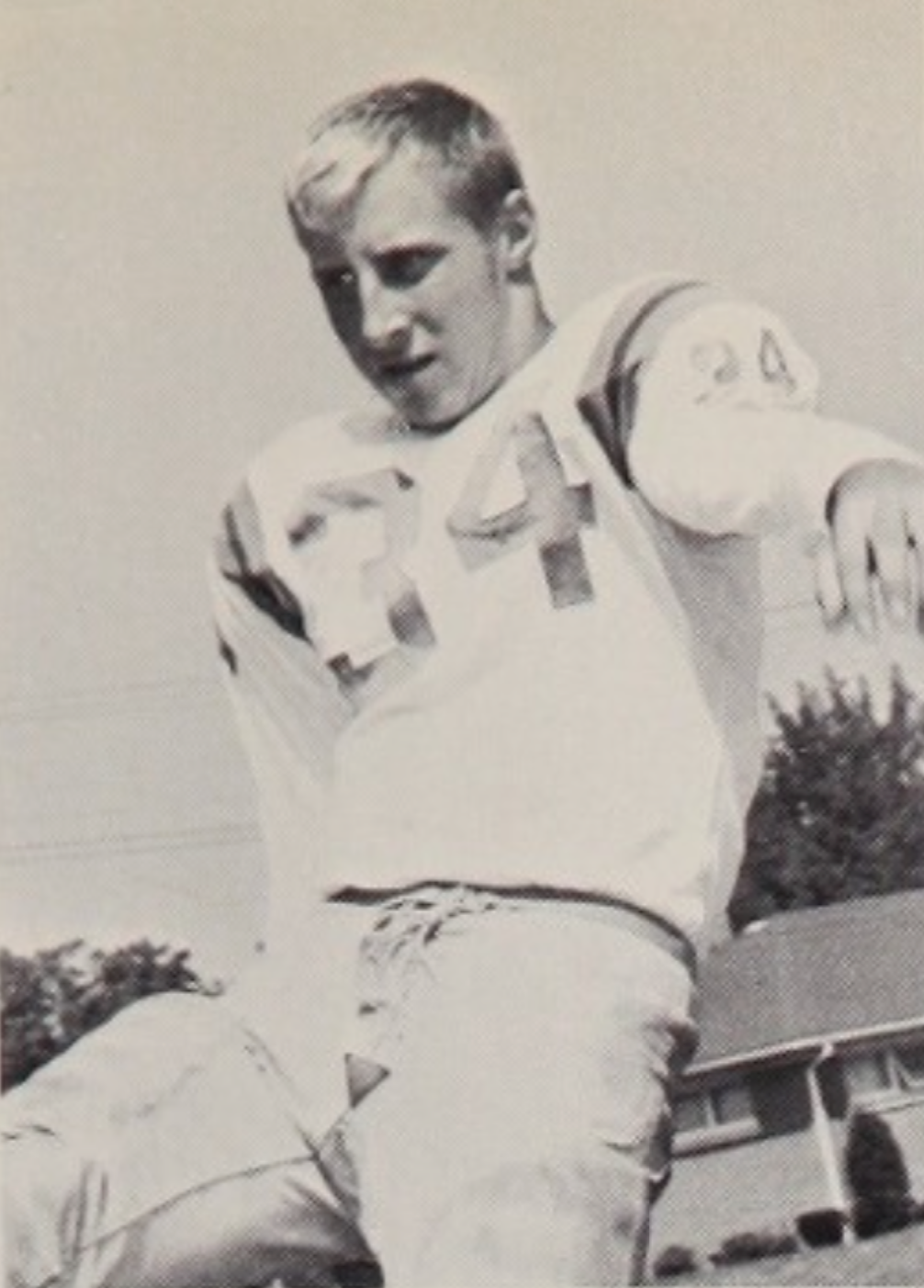
Fred Biletnikoff

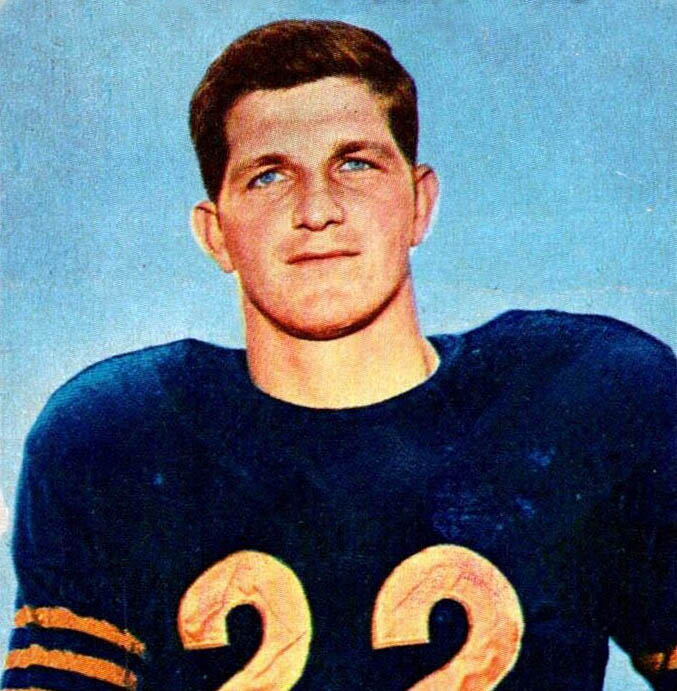
George Blanda

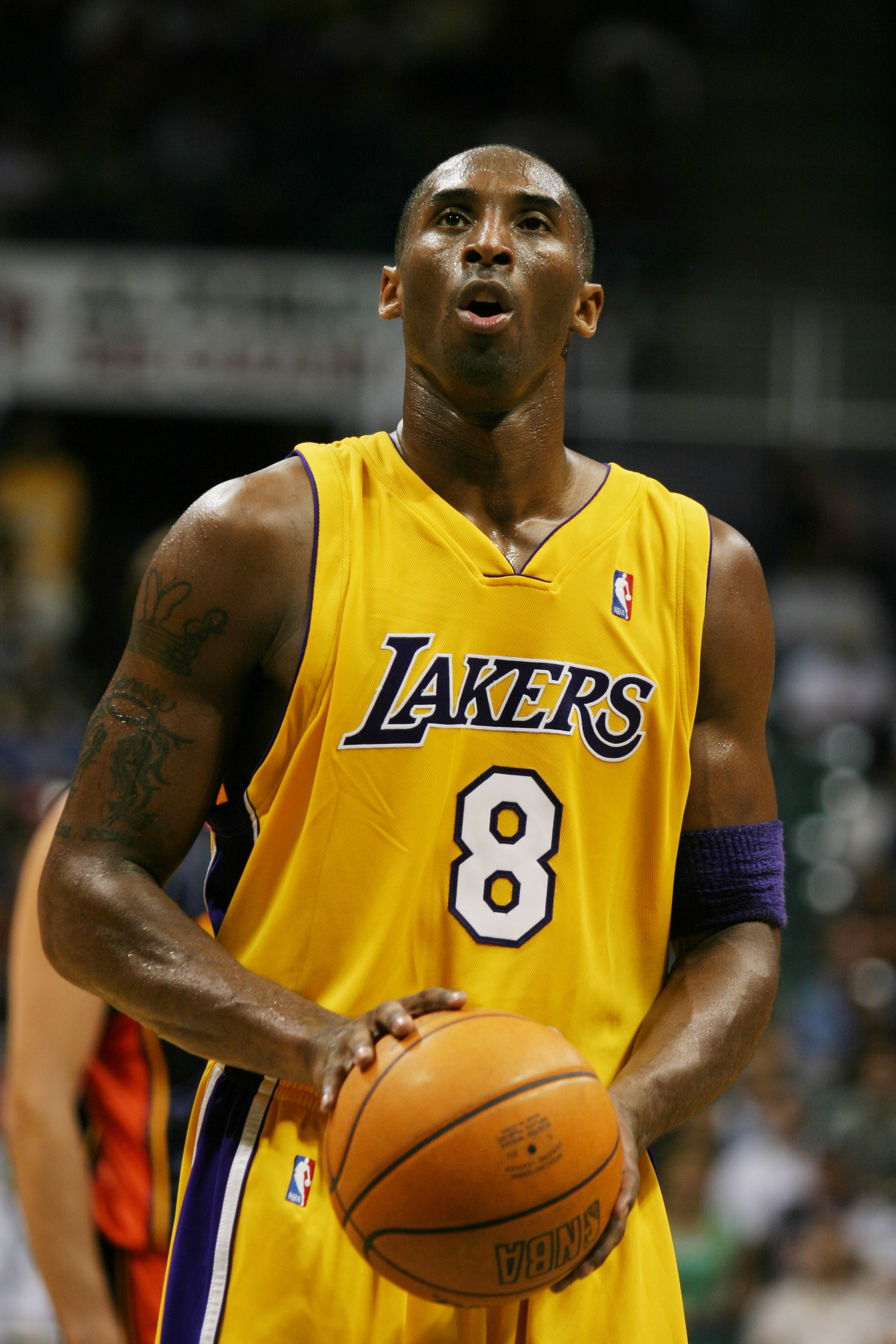
Kobe Bryant

- John Abramovic, professional basketball player—Pittsburgh
- Cal Abrams (1924–1997), Major League Baseball player—Philadelphia
- Matt Adams, professional baseball player—Philipsburg
- Herb Adderley, HOF professional football player—Philadelphia
- Eddie Alvarez, professional mixed martial artist—Philadelphia
- Rubén Amaro Jr. (born 1965), Major League Baseball player, general manager, and coach—Philadelphia
- Joe Amato, professional drag racer—Old Forge
- John Andretti, NASCAR driver—Bethlehem
- Marco Andretti, auto racing driver—Nazareth
- Michael Andretti, auto racing driver—Bethlehem
- Kurt Angle, professional wrestler, Olympic gold medalist in freestyle wrestling—Pittsburgh
- Paul Arizin, HOF professional basketball player—Philadelphia
- LaVar Arrington, professional football player—Pittsburgh
- Cameron Artis-Payne, professional football player—Harrisburg
- Al Babartsky, professional football player—Shenandoah
- Bob Babich, professional football coach—Aliquippa
- Kayla Bashore, Olympic field hockey player—Hamburg
- Ralph Baker, professional football player—Lewistown
- Saquon Barkley, professional football player—Coplay
- Charlie Batch, professional football player—Homestead
- William Beatty, professional football player—York
- Aaron Beasley, professional football player—Pottstown
- Joe Beimel, professional baseball player—Kersey
- Stan Belinda, professional baseball player—Huntingdon
- Bert Bell, professional football commissioner—Philadelphia
- Brad Benson, professional football player—Altoona
- Norm Benning, NASCAR driver—Level Green
- Jesse Biddle, professional baseball player—Philadelphia
- Fred Biletnikoff, HOF professional football player—Erie
- Steve Bilko, professional baseball player—Nanticoke
- Adam Bisnowaty (born 1993), professional football player—Pittsburgh
- Steve Blackman, professional wrestler—Annville
- DeJuan Blair, professional basketball player—Pittsburgh
- George Blanda, HOF professional football player—Youngwood
- Chaim Bloom (born 1983), Chief Baseball Officer for the Boston Red Sox
- Charlie Bolling, professional golfer—Rosemont
- Sam Bowie, professional basketball player—Lebanon
- Jerry Boyarsky, professional football player—Scott Township
- Tyler Boyd, professional football player—Clairton
- Jennifer Brady, professional tennis player—Harrisburg
- Kyle Brady, professional football player—Camp Hill
- Sid Bream, professional baseball player—Mount Holly Springs
- Steve Breaston, professional football player—North Braddock
- Gustave Brickner, extreme swimmer—Charleroi
- Tom Brookens, professional baseball player—Chambersburg
- Corey Brown, professional football player—Philadelphia
- Gary Brown, professional football player—Williamsport
- John Brown, HOF college football player—Canton
- Philly Brown, professional football player—Upper Darby
- Scott Brunner, professional football player—Sellersville
- Kobe Bryant, professional basketball player—Lower Merion Township
- Taylor Buchholz, professional baseball player—Lower Merion Township
- Ryan Buchter, professional baseball player—Reading
- Marc Bulger, professional football player—Pittsburgh
- Leroy Burrell, track and field—Lansdowne
- Rasual Butler, professional basketball player—Philadelphia
- Nate Byham, NFL tight end—Franklin
- Axtell J. Byles, NFL player—Titusville

C–D

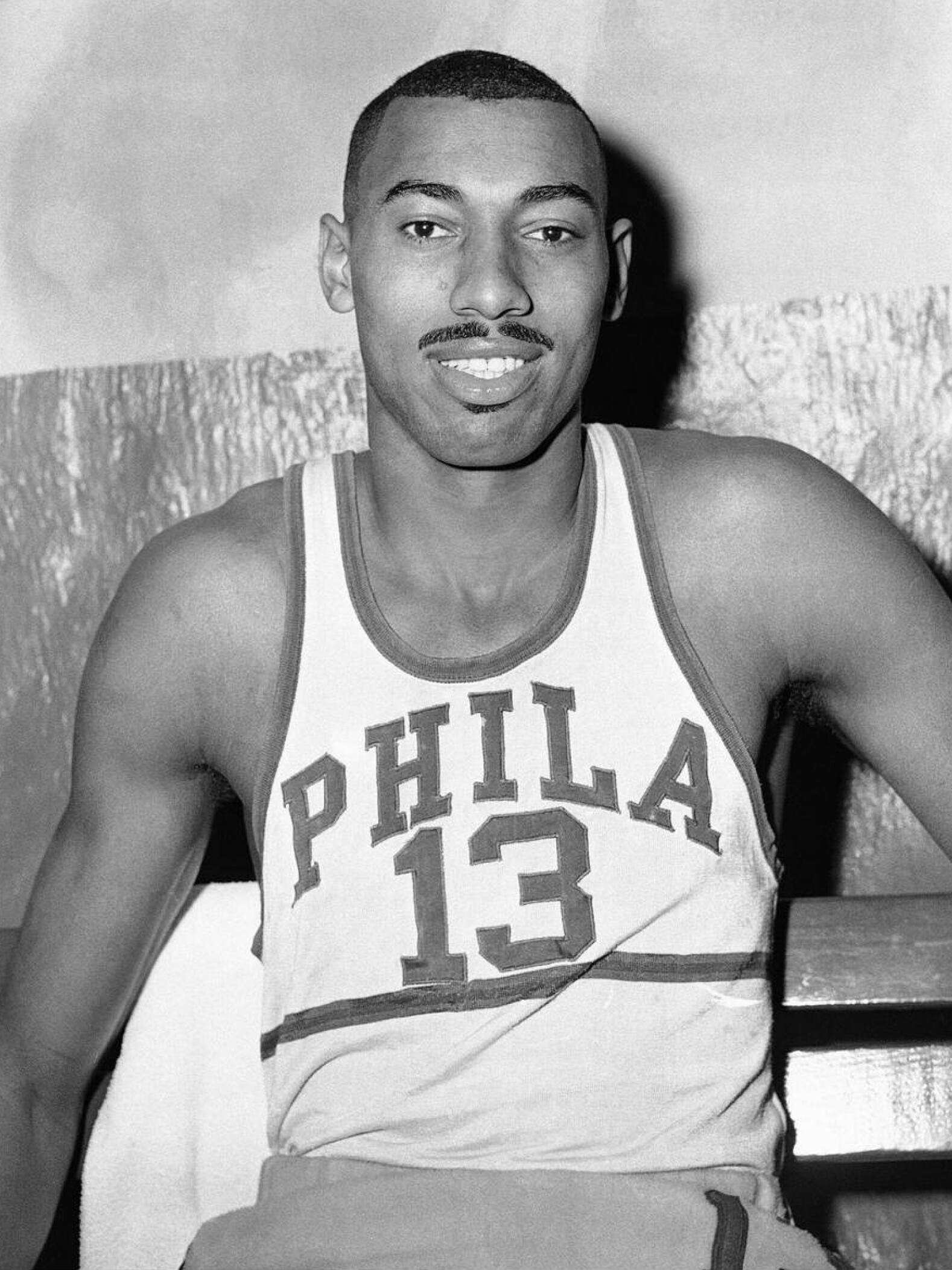
Wilt Chamberlain

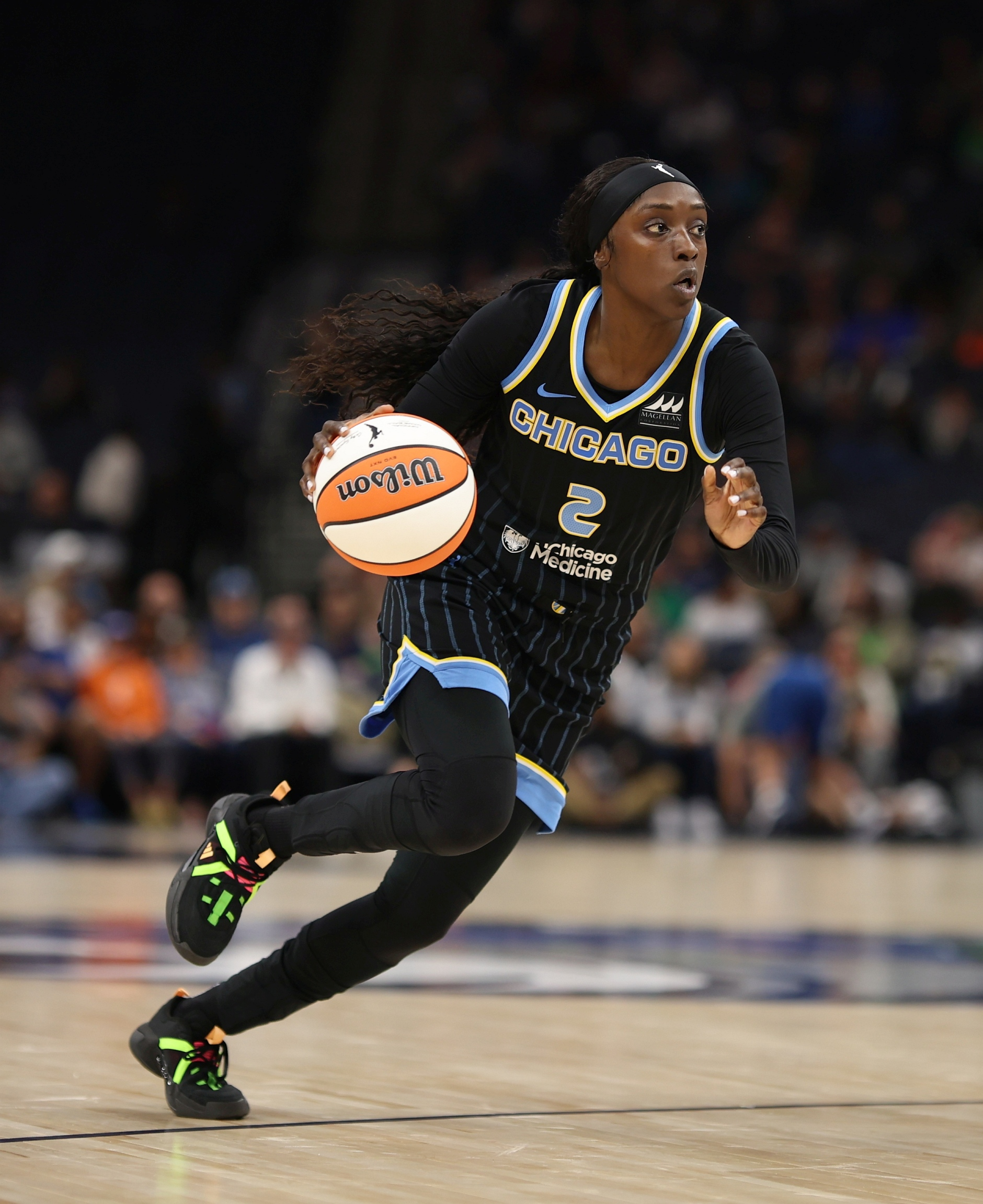
Kahleah Copper

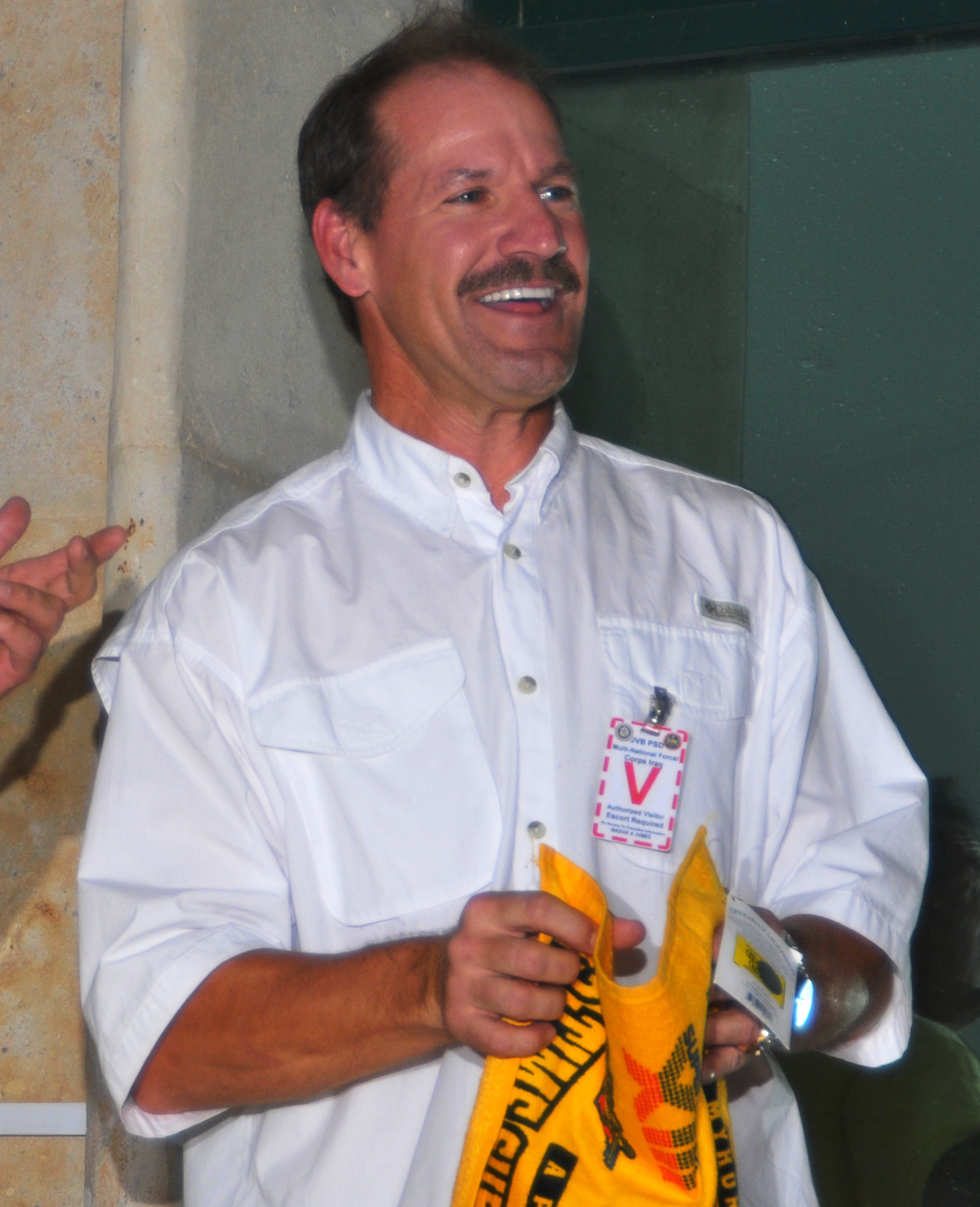
Bill Cowher

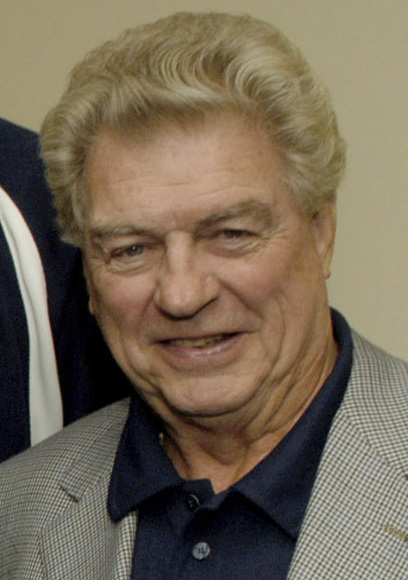
Chuck Daly

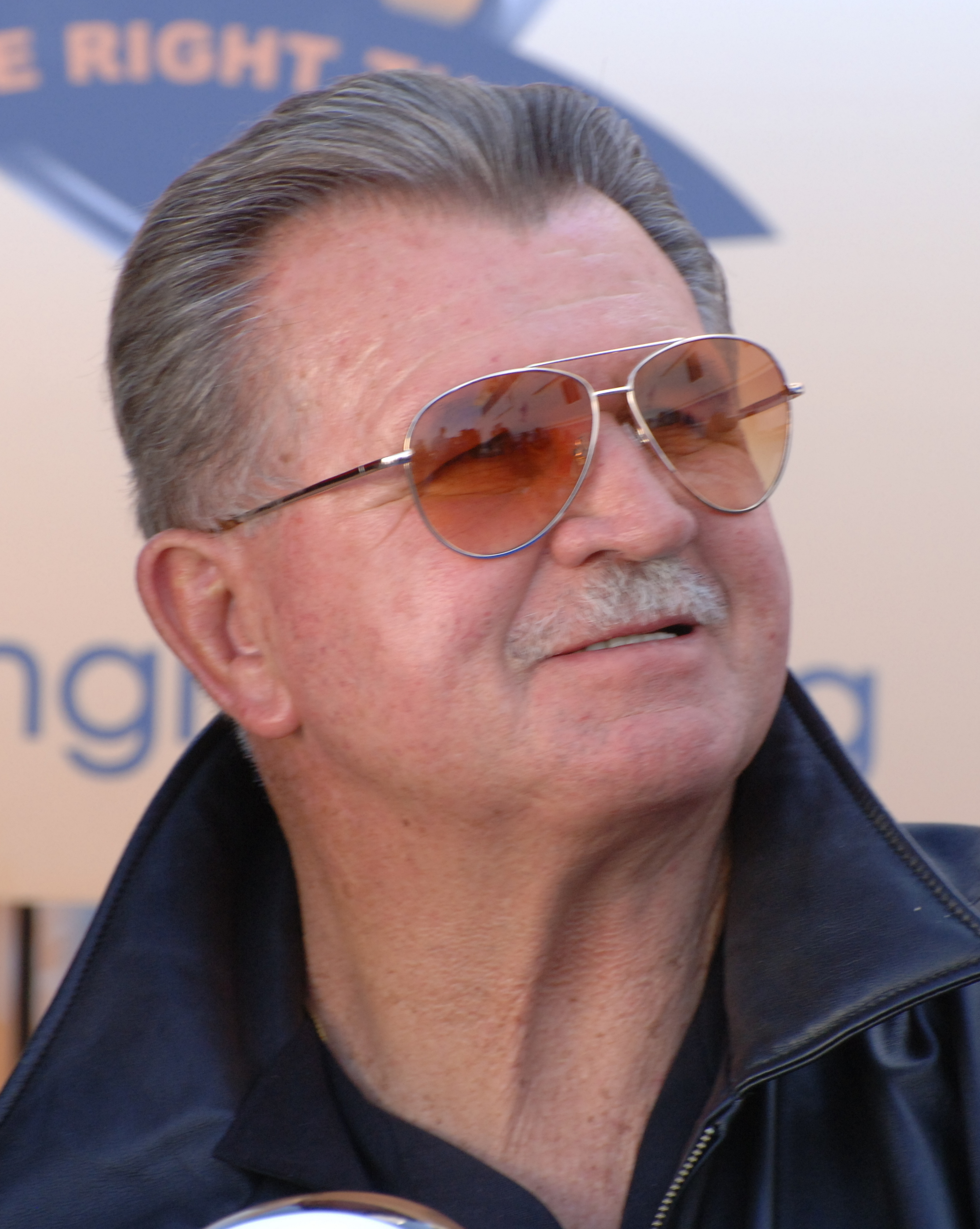
Mike Ditka

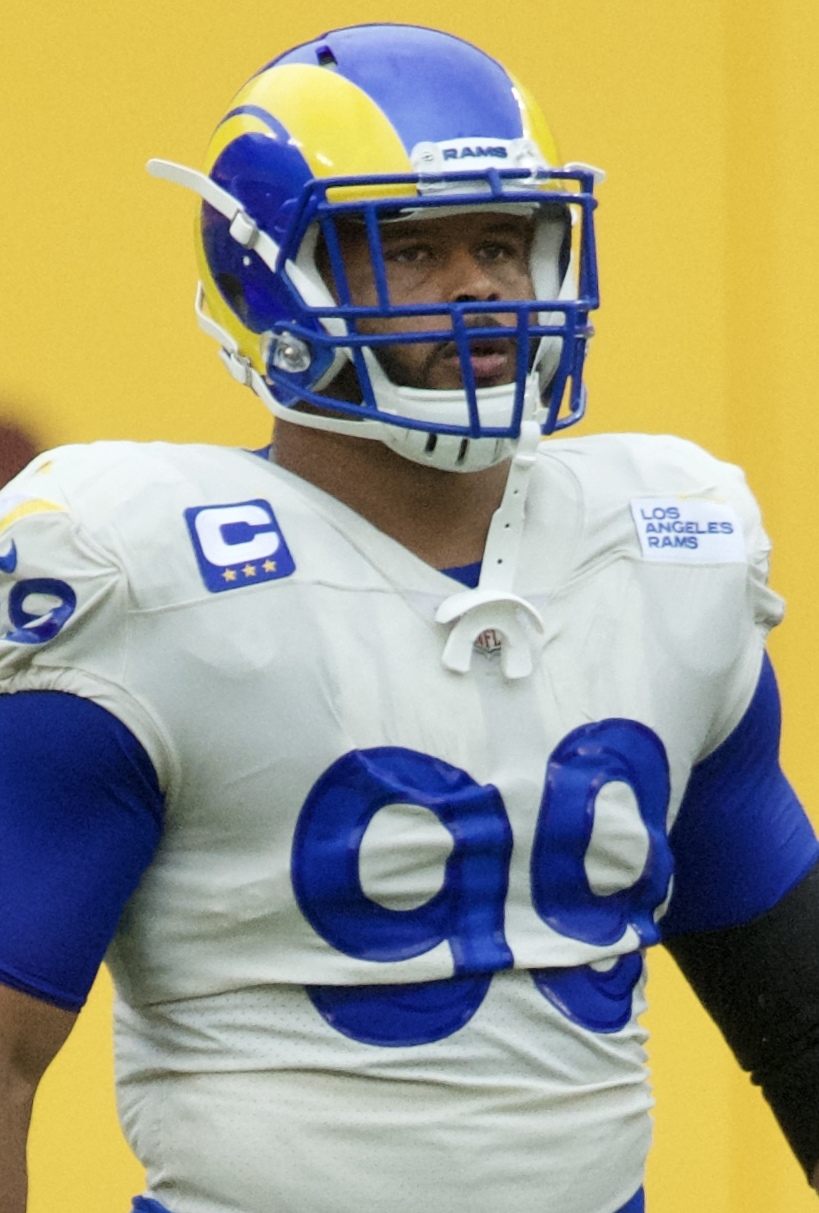
Aaron Donald

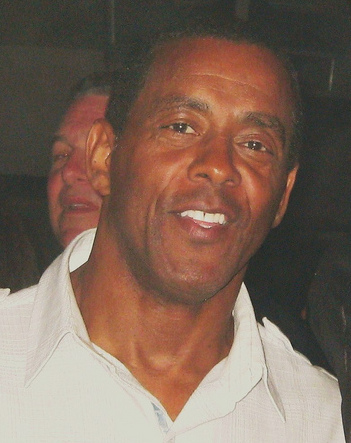
Tony Dorsett

- Alex Cabrera, professional baseball player—Lebanon
- Ray Caldwell, professional baseball player—McKean County
- John Calipari, college basketball coach—Moon Township
- Roy Campanella, HOF professional baseball player—Philadelphia
- Russ Canzler, professional baseball player—Berwick
- John Cappelletti, professional football player—Upper Darby
- P. J. Carlesimo, professional basketball coach—Scranton
- Nate Carr, Olympic bronze medalist in freestyle wrestling—Erie
- Tony Carr (born 1997), basketball player in the Israeli Premier Basketball League—Philadelphia
- Pete Carril, HOF college basketball coach—Bethlehem
- Matt Carroll, professional basketball player—Pittsburgh
- Len Chappell, professional basketball player—Portage
- Wilt Chamberlain, HOF professional basketball player—Philadelphia
- Barry Church, professional football player—Pittsburgh
- Nestor Chylak, professional baseball umpire—Olyphant
- Bruce Clark, professional football player—New Castle
- Bryan Cohen (born 1989), American-Israeli professional basketball player—Philadelphia
- Colby Cohen (born 1989), professional ice hockey player—Villanova
- Jake Cohen (born 1990), American-Israeli professional basketball player—Bryn Mawr
- Julia Cohen (born 1989), tennis player—Philadelphia
- Billy Conn, professional boxer—Pittsburgh
- James Conner, professional football player—Erie, Pennsylvania
- Harry Coveleski, professional baseball player—Shamokin
- Stan Coveleski, HOF baseball player—Shamokin
- Fran Crippen, swimmer—Conshohocken
- Maddy Crippen, Olympic swimmer—Conshohocken
- Tom Clements, professional football coach—McKees Rocks
- Gary Collins, professional football player—Williamstown
- Joe Collins, professional baseball player—Scranton
- Kerry Collins, professional football player—Lebanon
- Marques Colston, professional football player—Susquehanna Township
- Dan Conners, professional football player—St. Mary's
- Dan Connor, professional football player—Wallingford
- Kahleah Copper, professional basketball player–Philadelphia
- Mark Corey, professional baseball player—Austin
- Mike Costanzo, professional baseball player—Philadelphia
- Jim Covert, professional football player—Conway
- Bill Cowher, professional football coach—Crafton
- Billy Cox, professional baseball player—Newport
- Mike Cox, professional football player—Lewisberry
- Channing Crowder, professional football player—State College
- Chris Culliver, professional football player—Philadelphia
- David Curtiss, competitive swimmer—Yardley
- Chuck Daly, HOF professional basketball coach—Kane
- Bob Davie, college football coach—Moon Township
- Ernie Davis, HOF college football player—New Salem-Buffington
- Phil Davis, UFC fighter—Harrisburg
- Darrell Dess, professional football player—New Castle
- James Develin, professional football player—Boyertown
- Dorin Dickerson, professional football player—Imperial
- Keir Dillon, professional snowboarder—East Stroudsburg
- Mike Ditka, HOF professional football player and coach—Aliquippa
- Randy Dobnak, professional baseball player—South Park
- Tim Donaghy, professional basketball referee—Havertown
- Aaron Donald, professional football player—Pittsburgh
- Jakim Donaldson (born 1983), basketball player in the Israeli Basketball Premier League–Pittsburgh
- Keith Dorney, professional football player—Emmaus
- Tony Dorsett, HOF professional football player—Hopewell Township
- Forrest "Jap" Douds, professional football player and coach—Rochester
- Shane Douglas, professional wrestler—Pittsburgh
- Jim Drucker (born 1952/1953), former Commissioner of the Continental Basketball Association, former Commissioner of the Arena Football League, and founder of NewKadia Comics—Plymouth Meeting
- Jeff Dugan, professional football player—Pittsburgh
- Pete Duranko, professional football player—Johnstown
- Jimmy Dykes, professional baseball player—Philadelphia
- Stanley Dziedzic, Olympic bronze medalist in freestyle wrestling—Allentown

E–G

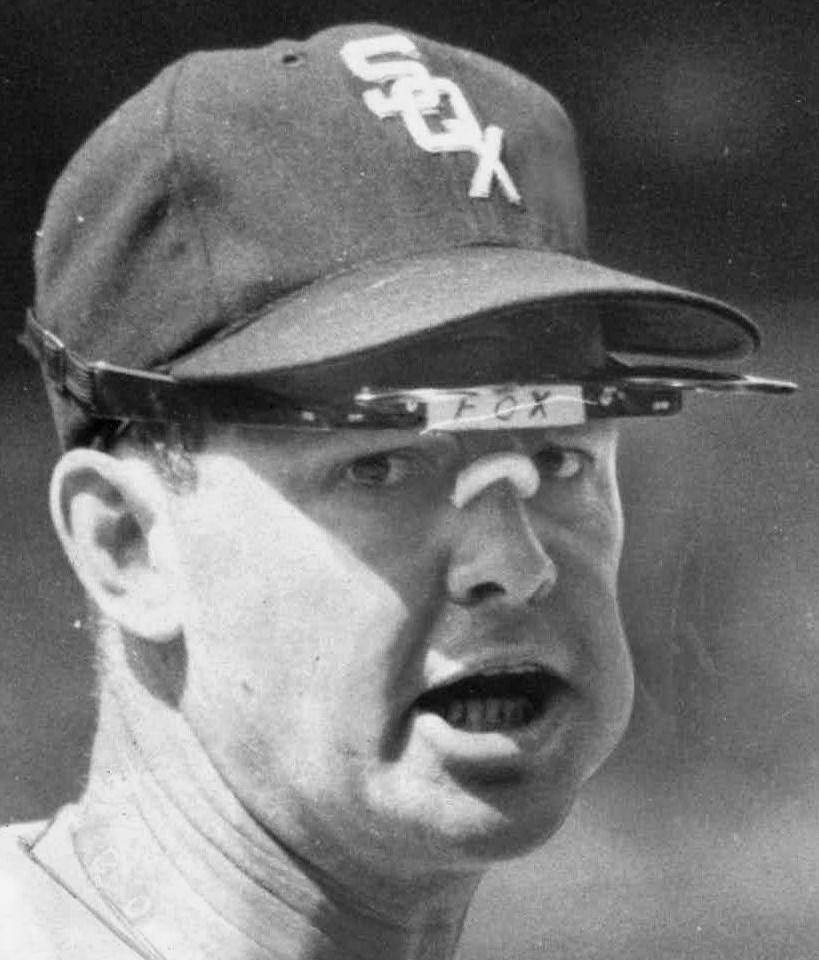
Nellie Fox

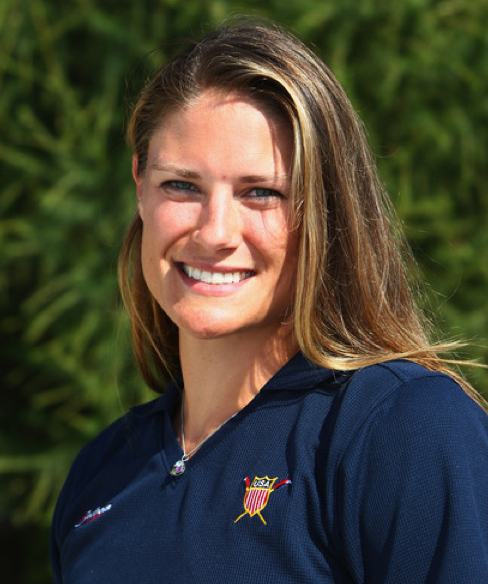
Susan Francia

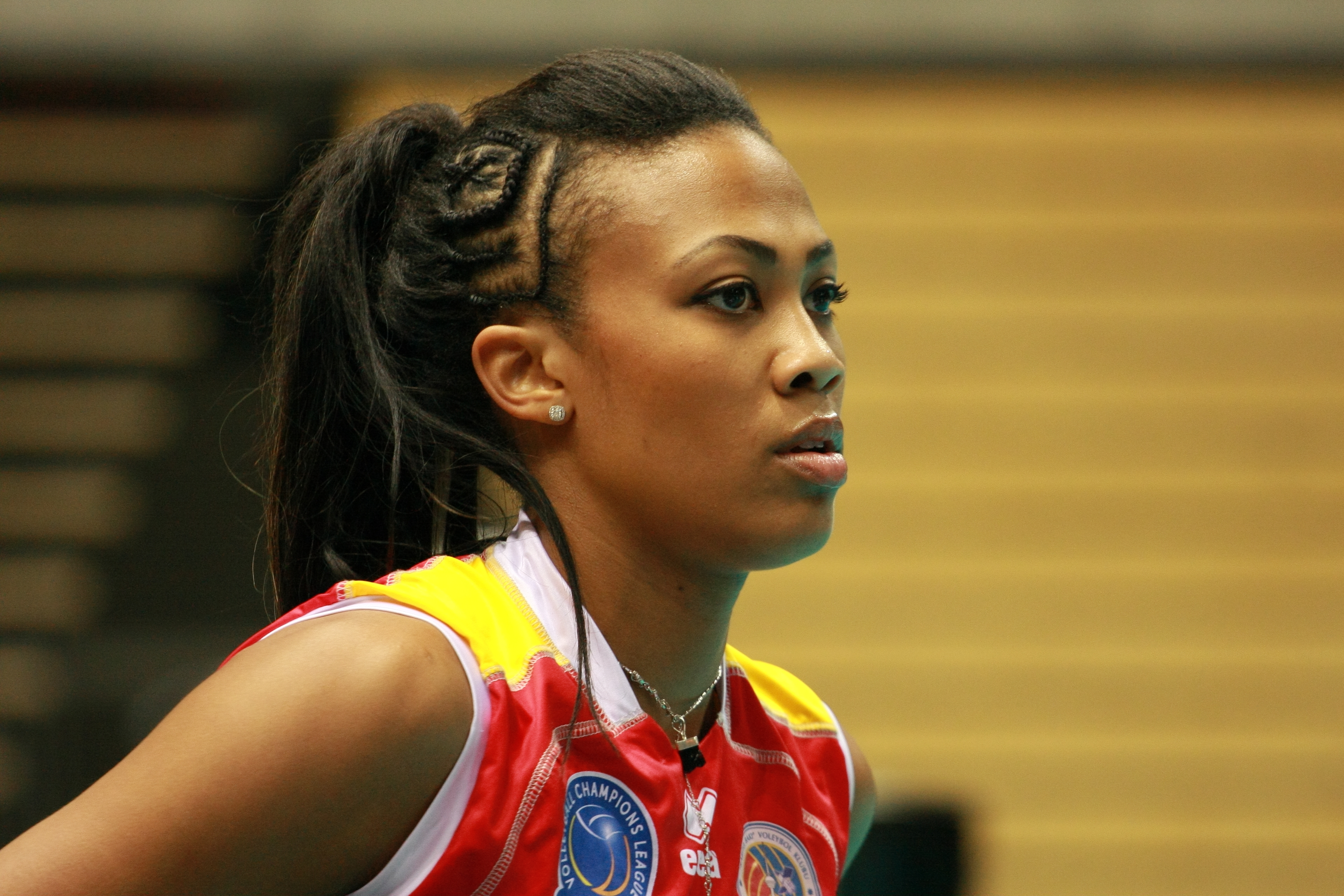
Kimberly Glass

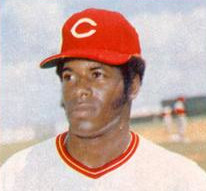
Ken Griffey Sr.

- Bill Eadie, professional wrestler—Brownsville
- Kyle Eckel, professional football player—Philadelphia
- Josh Edgin, professional baseball player—Three Springs
- Wayne Ellington, professional basketball player—Wynnewood
- Cody Eppley, professional baseball player—Dillsburg
- Jahri Evans, professional football player—Philadelphia
- Tyreke Evans, professional basketball player—Chester
- Tim Federowicz, professional baseball player—Erie
- Bill Ferrario, professional football player—Scranton
- Randy Fichtner, professional football coach—Meadville
- Frank Filchock, professional football player and coach—Greene County
- D'or Fischer (born 1981), Israeli-American basketball player in the Israeli National League—Philadelphia
- Joe Flacco, professional football player—Philadelphia
- Pat Flaherty, professional football coach—McSherrystown
- Hali Flickinger, Olympic swimmer—York County
- Andre Fluellen, professional football player—Philadelphia
- Tom Flynn, professional football player—Verona
- Nellie Fox, HOF professional baseball player—St. Thomas Township
- Susan Francia, Olympic gold medalist rower–Abington
- Terry Francona, professional baseball manager—New Brighton
- Tito Francona, professional baseball player—New Brighton
- John Frank (born 1962), professional football player—Pittsburgh
- Buck Freeman, professional baseball player—Catasauqua
- Gus Frerotte, professional football player—Kittanning
- Carl Furillo, professional baseball player—Stony Creek Mills
- Jim Furyk, professional golfer—Lancaster
- Rich Gannon, professional football player—Philadelphia
- Ryan Garko, professional baseball player—Pittsburgh
- Jason Garrett, professional football coach—Abington
- John Garrett, professional football coach—Danville
- Eddie George, professional football player—Abington Township
- Sam Gerson, Olympic silver medalist in freestyle wrestling—Philadelphia
- Sean Gilbert, professional football player—Aliquippa
- Armen Gilliam, professional basketball player—Bethel Park
- Garry Gilliam, professional football player—Harrisburg
- Kimberly Glass, professional volleyball player—Lancaster
- Tom Gola, HOF basketball player—Philadelphia
- Robbie Gould, professional football player—Jersey Shore
- Bruce Gradkowski, professional football player—Pittsburgh
- Gino Gradkowski, professional football player—Pittsburgh
- Aaron Gray, professional basketball player—Emmaus
- Dick Gray, professional baseball player—Jefferson
- Al Gionfriddo, professional baseball player—Dysart
- Ken Griffey Jr., professional baseball player—Donora
- Ken Griffey Sr., professional baseball player—Donora
- Russ Grimm, professional football player—Scottdale
- Dick Groat, professional baseball player—Wilkinsburg
- Randy Grossman (born 1952), professional football player—Haverford Township
- Peter Gruner, professional wrestler, ring name Billy Kidman—Allentown
- Brandon Guyer, professional baseball player—West Chester

H–K

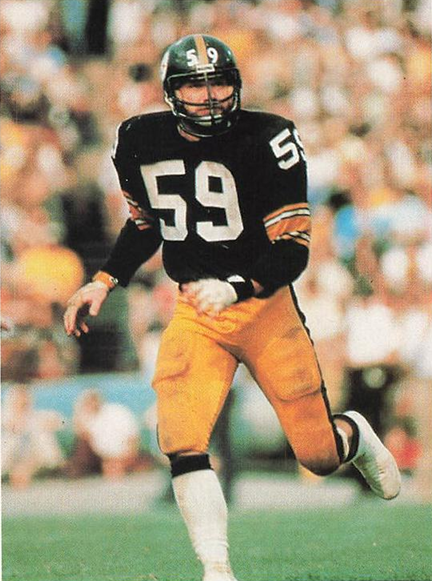
Jack Ham

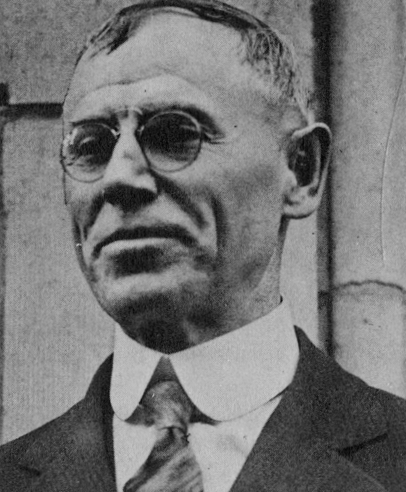
John Heisman

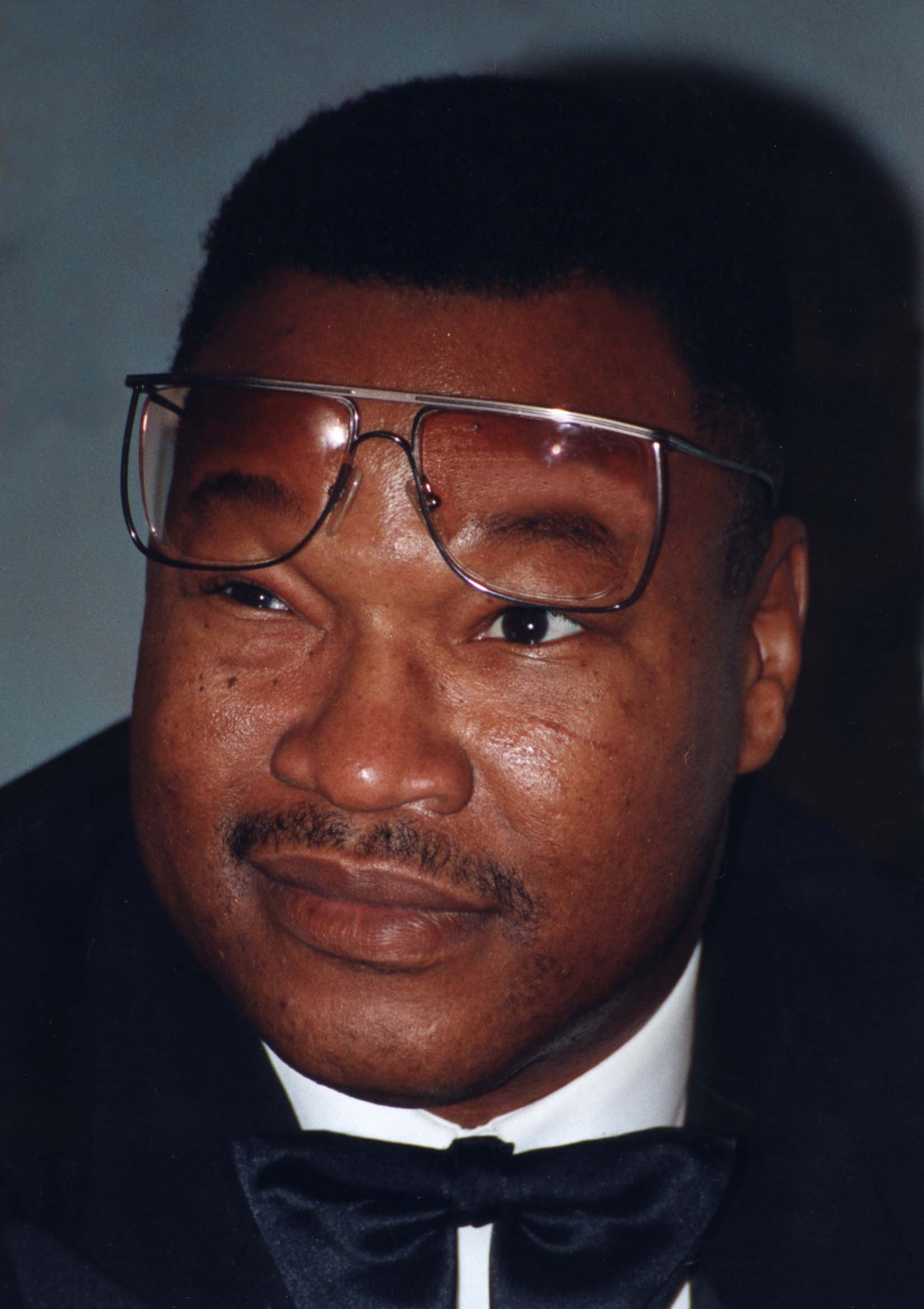
Larry Holmes

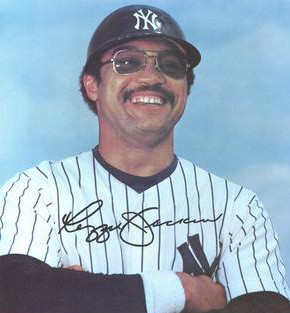
Reggie Jackson

- Jack Ham, professional football player—Johnstown
- Richard Hamilton, professional basketball player
- Brendan Hansen, Olympic gold medal swimmer—Haverford Township
- Marvin Harrison, professional football player—Philadelphia
- Ray Harroun, winner of the first Indianapolis 500—Titusville
- Leon Hart, professional football player—Pittsburgh
- Jim Haslett, professional football player and coach—Pittsburgh
- Andrew Hawkins, professional football player—Johnstown
- Artrell Hawkins, professional football player—Johnstown
- Don Heffner, professional baseball player and manager—Rouzerville
- Chris Heisey, professional baseball player—Mount Joy
- John Heisman, football player, namesake of trophy—Titusville
- Gerald Henderson Jr., professional basketball player—Merion
- Chad Henne, professional football player—Wyomissing
- Jake Herbert, Olympic freestyle wrestler—Pittsburgh
- Tom Herr, professional baseball player and manager—Lancaster
- Mark Herzlich, professional football player—Wayne
- Cameron Heyward, professional football player—Pittsburgh
- Eric Hicks, professional football player—Erie
- Jordan Hill, professional football player—Harrisburg
- Shawn Hillegas, professional baseball player—South Fork
- Darrun Hilliard, professional basketball player
- Al Holbert, professional auto racer—Warrington
- Larry Holmes, HOF professional boxer—Easton
- J. J. Hoover, professional baseball player—Elizabeth
- Bernard Hopkins, professional boxer—Philadelphia
- Jeff Hostetler, professional football player—Hollsopple
- Art Howe, professional baseball player and manager—Pittsburgh
- Gene Huey, professional football player—Uniontown
- Henry Hynoski, professional football player—Elysburg
- Jerald Ingram, professional football coach—Beaver
- Sam Iorio (born 1998), American-Israeli basketball player in the Israeli Basketball Premier League
- Qadry Ismail, professional football player—Wilkes-Barre
- Raghib Ismail, professional football player—Wilkes-Barre
- Marc Jackson, professional basketball player—Philadelphia
- Marlin Jackson, professional football player—Sharon
- Reggie Jackson, HOF professional baseball player—Wyncote
- Brook Jacoby, professional baseball player—Philadelphia
- Hughie Jennings, professional baseball player—Pittston
- Larry Johnson, professional football player—State College
- Derrick Jones Jr., professional basketball player—Chester
- Eddie Jones, professional basketball player—Philadelphia
- Kevin Jones, professional BMX rider—York
- Sage Karam, professional racing driver—Nazareth
- George Karl, professional basketball coach—Penn Hills
- Nate Karns, professional baseball player—Franklin
- Don Kelly, professional baseball player—Butler
- Jim Kelly, HOF professional football player—Bradys Bend Township
- Pat Kelly, professional baseball player—Philadelphia
- Ray Kemp, professional football player—Cecil Township
- Billy Kidman (ring name), professional wrestler—Allentown
- Ethan Kilmer, professional football player—Wyalusing
- Bucko Kilroy, professional football player and coach—Philadelphia
- Betsy King, HOF professional golfer—Reading
- Steve Kline, professional baseball player—Winfield
- Cary Kolat, freestyle wrestler, two-time world medalist—Rices Landing
- Dan Koppen, professional football player—Whitehall Township
- Josh Koscheck, professional mixed martial artist—Waynesburg
- Kristy Kowal, Olympic swimmer—Reading
- Bruce Kozerski, professional football player—Plains Township
- Erik Kratz, professional baseball player—Telford
- Julian Krinsky, tennis player-Philadelphia
- John Kuhn, professional football player—Dover
- Nick Kurtz, professional baseball player—Lancaster

L–M

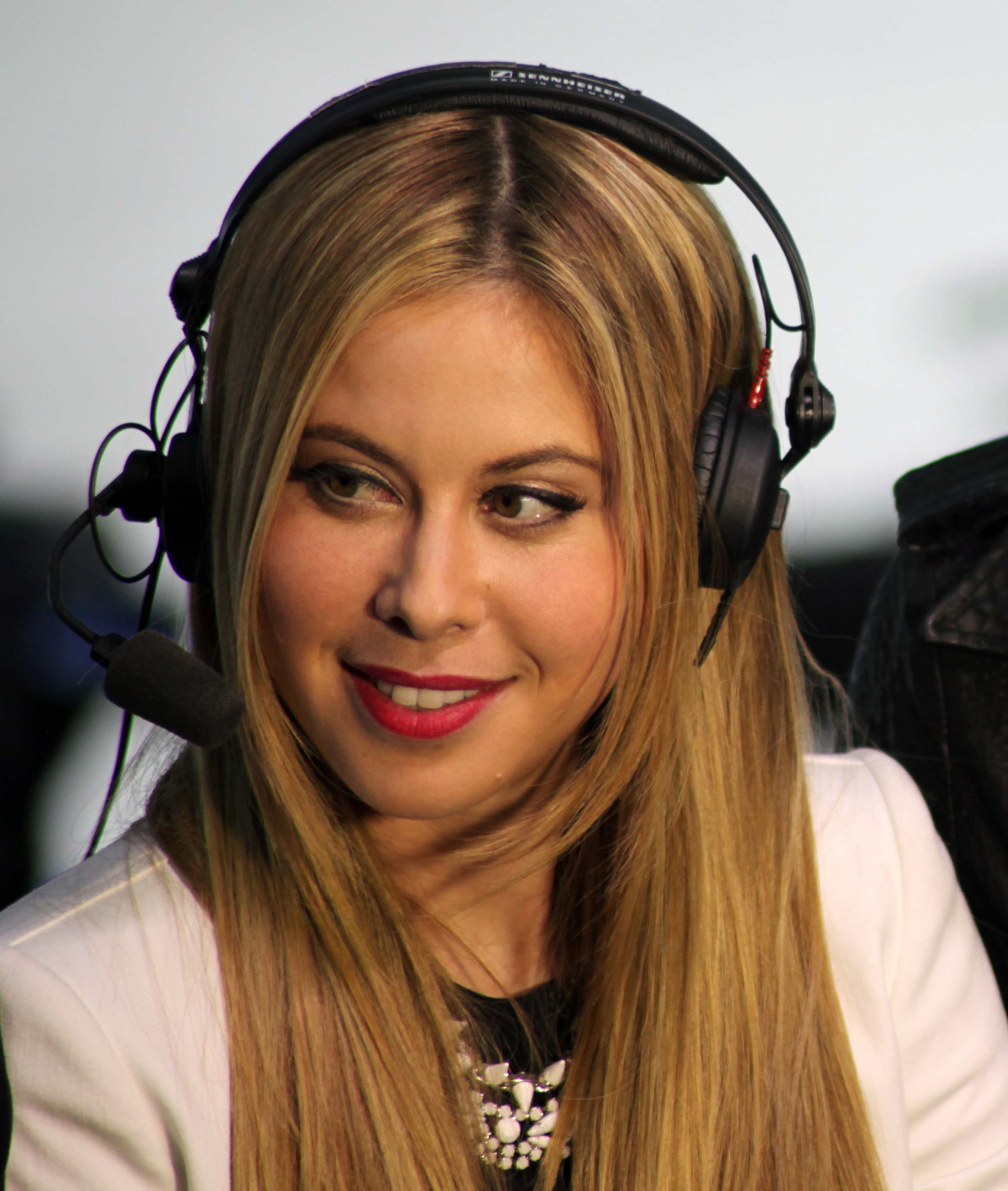
Tara Lipinski

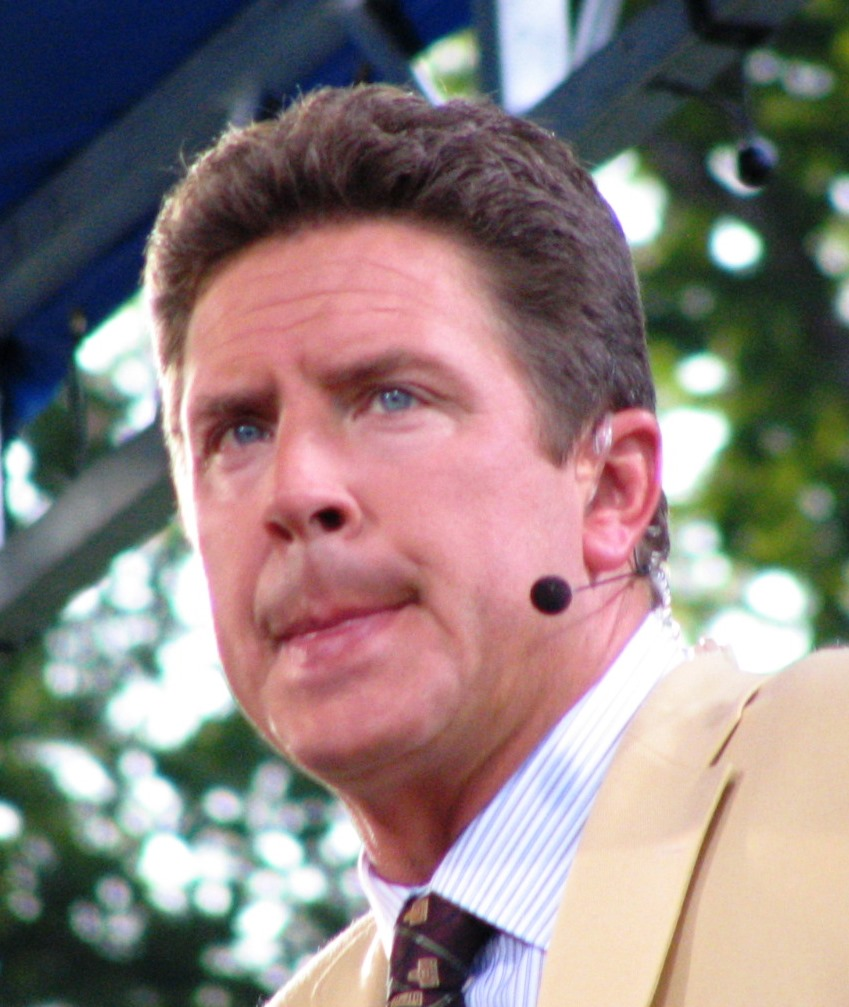
Dan Marino

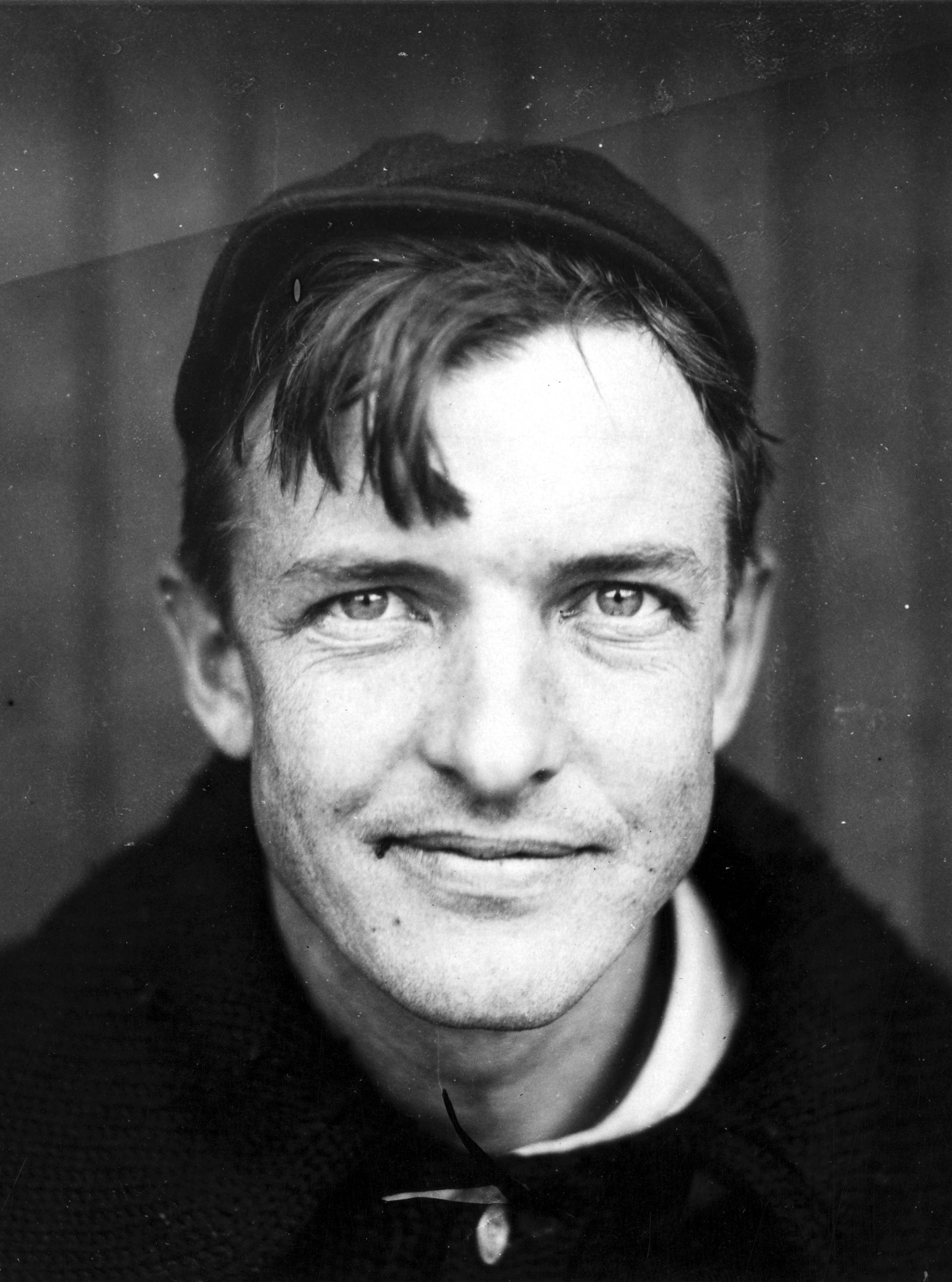
Christy Mathewson

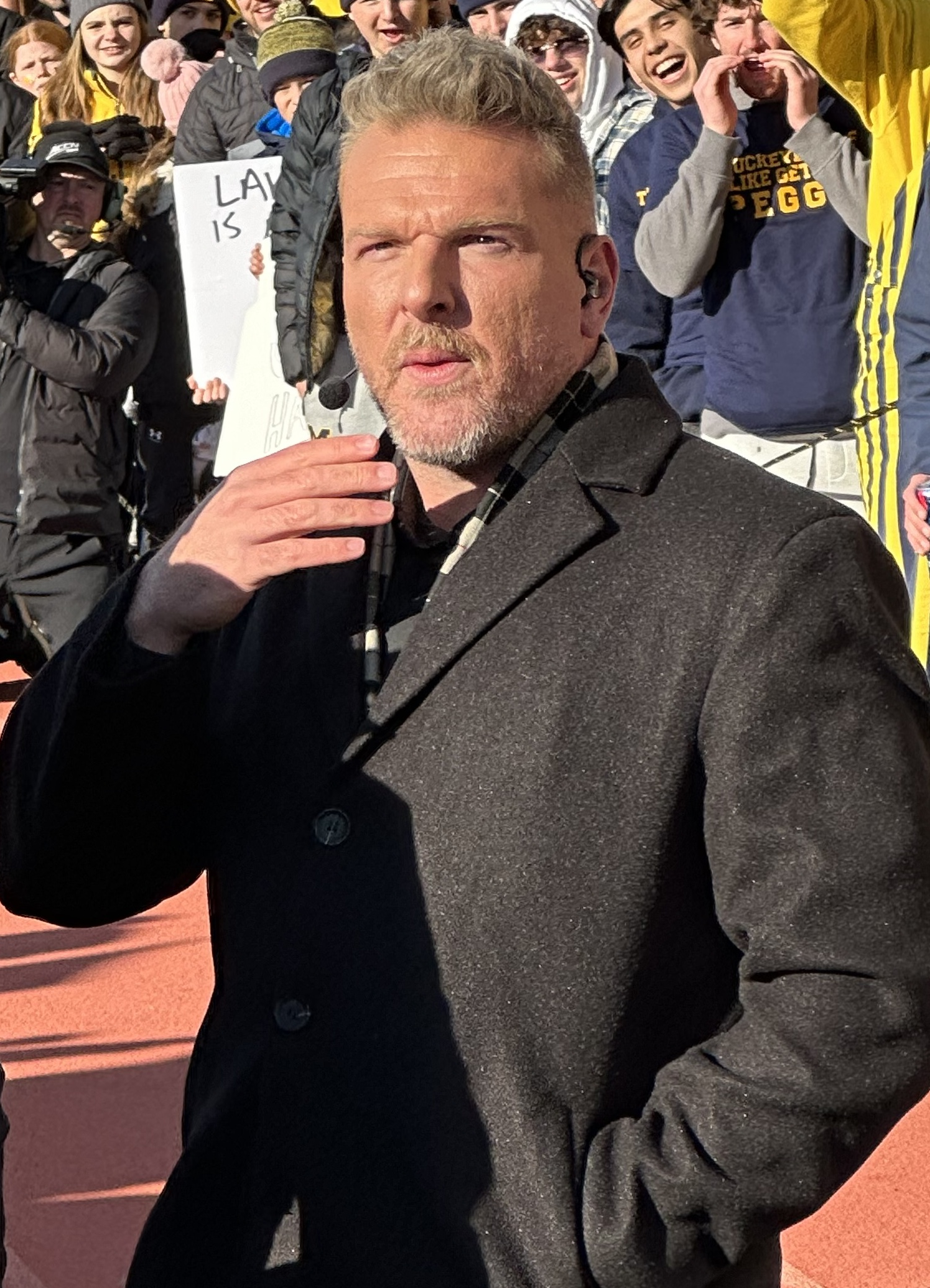
Pat McAfee

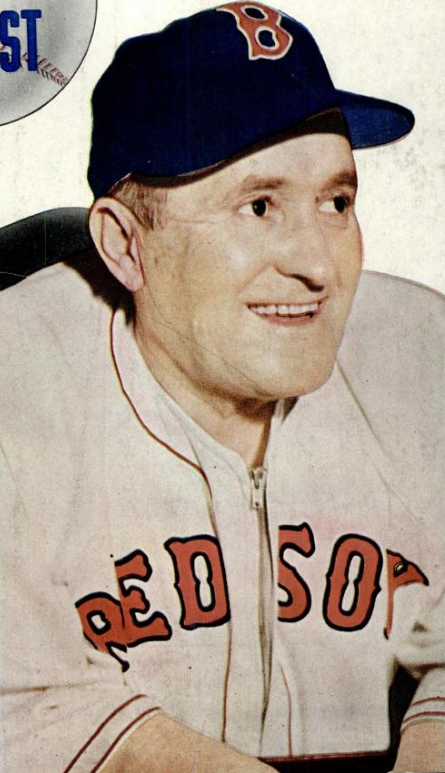
Joe McCarthy

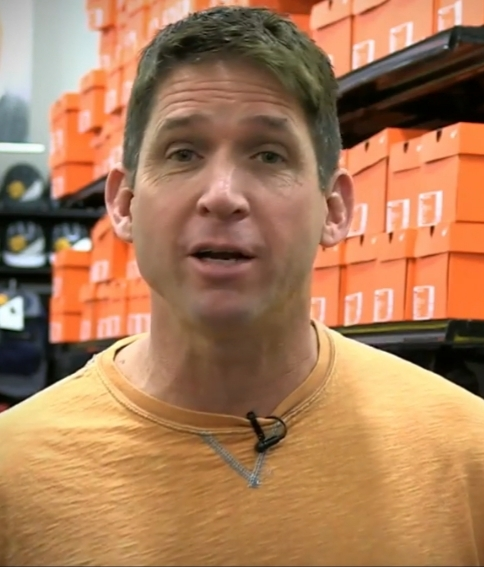
Ed McCaffrey

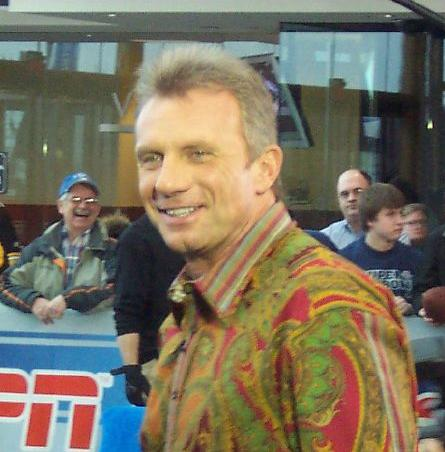
Joe Montana

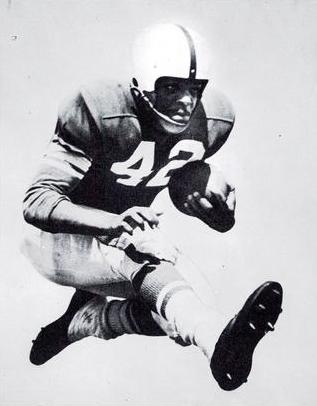
Lenny Moore

- Floyd Landis, professional cyclist—Lancaster
- Tom Lasorda, HOF professional baseball manager—Norristown
- Howard Lassoff (1955–2013), American-Israeli basketball player
- Ty Law, professional football player—Aliquippa
- Sean Lee, professional football player—Pittsburgh
- Don LeJohn, professional baseball manager—Daisytown
- Matt Lengel, professional football player—Mechanicsburg
- Chad Levitt, professional football player—Cheltenham
- Dion Lewis, professional football player—Penn Hills
- Grant Lewis, professional ice hockey player—Upper St. Clair
- Ralph Lewis, professional basketball player and coach—Philadelphia
- Ryan Lexer (born 1976), American-Israeli basketball player—Philadelphia
- Tara Lipinski, Olympic gold medalist in figure skating—Philadelphia
- Kyle Lowry, professional basketball player—Philadelphia
- Maurice Lucas, professional basketball player—Pittsburgh
- Johnny Lujack, HOF professional football player—Connellsville
- Chloe Lukasiak, actor, featured dancer on Dance Moms—Churchill (Pittsburgh/Mars)
- Sparky Lyle professional baseball player—Reynoldsville
- Joe Maddon, professional baseball manager—Hazleton
- Brooke Makler (1951–2010), Olympic fencer
- Paul Makler Jr. (born 1946), Olympic fencer
- Paul Makler Sr. (1920–2022), Olympic fencer
- Ryan Malone, professional hockey player—Upper St. Clair
- Greg Manusky, professional football player—Dallas
- Bam Margera, professional skateboarder—West Chester
- Pete Maravich, HOF professional basketball player—Aliquippa
- Dan Marino, HOF professional football player—Pittsburgh
- Brandon Marshall, professional football player—Pittsburgh
- Donyell Marshall, professional basketball player—Reading
- Tim Masthay, professional football player—Pittsburgh
- Christy Mathewson, HOF professional baseball player—Factoryville
- Michael R. Matz, Olympic equestrian and thoroughbred trainer—Collegeville
- Pat McAfee, professional football player—Plum
- Matt McBride, professional baseball player—Bethlehem
- Ed McCaffrey, professional football player—Waynesboro
- Joe McCarthy, HOF baseball manager—Philadelphia
- Mike McCarthy, American football coach—Pittsburgh
- John J. McDermott, professional golfer—Philadelphia
- Jameel McClain, professional football player—Philadelphia
- Robert McClain, professional football player—Philadelphia
- LeSean McCoy, professional football player—Harrisburg
- Mike McCoy, professional football player—Erie
- Muffet McGraw, college basketball coach—Pottstown
- Aaron Mckie, professional basketball player—Philadelphia
- Josephine McKim, Olympic swimming gold medalist—Oil City
- Brandon McManus, professional football player—Philadelphia
- Rocco Mediate, professional golfer—Greensburg
- Mike Mentzer, bodybuilder, 1979 Mr. Olympia—Ephrata
- Devin Mesoraco, professional baseball player—Punxsutawney
- Lou Michaels, professional football player—Swoyersville
- Walt Michaels, pro football player and coach—Swoyersville
- Matt Millen, professional football player—Whitehall Township
- Abby Lee Miller, star of Pittsburgh-based Dance Moms and owner of Abby Lee Dance Company—Penn Hills (Note: Sources cited in her article state that her studio is in Pittsburgh, but not whether she lives in the city itself.)
- Eric Milton, professional baseball pitcher—Bellefonte
- Cuttino Mobley, professional basketball player—Philadelphia
- Earl Monroe, HOF professional basketball player—Philadelphia
- Joe Montana, HOF professional football player—New Eagle
- Nick Moody, professional football player—Wyncote
- Lenny Moore, HOF professional football player—Reading
- Michael Moorer, professional boxer—Monessen
- Charles Morgan, professional football player—Allentown
- Marcus Morris, professional basketball player—Philadelphia
- Markieff Morris, professional basketball player—Philadelphia
- Mercury Morris, professional football player—Pittsburgh
- Jamie Moyer, professional baseball player—Sellersville
- Terry Mulholland, professional baseball player—Uniontown
- Mike Munchak, professional football player—Scranton
- Ryan Mundy, professional football player—Pittsburgh
- James Mungro, professional football player—East Stroudsburg
- Flip Murray, professional basketball player—Philadelphia
- Stan Musial, HOF professional baseball player—Donora
- Mike Mussina, professional baseball player—Montoursville

N–R

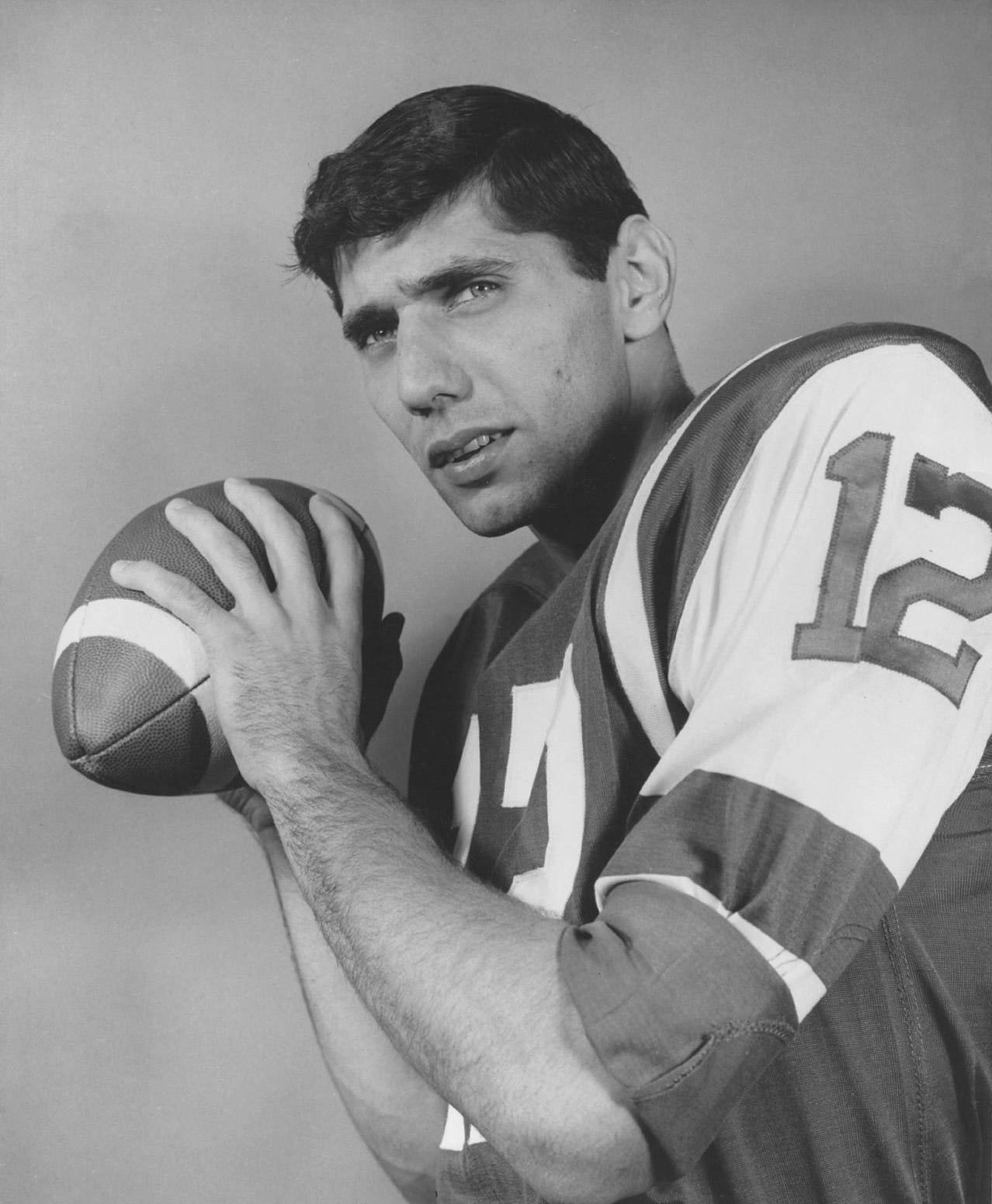
Joe Namath

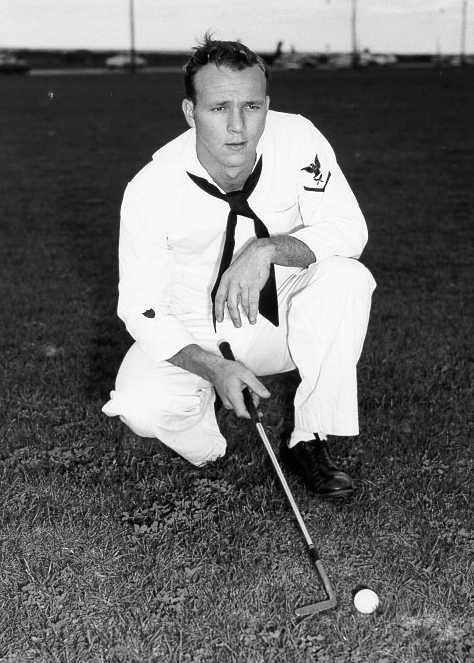
Arnold Palmer

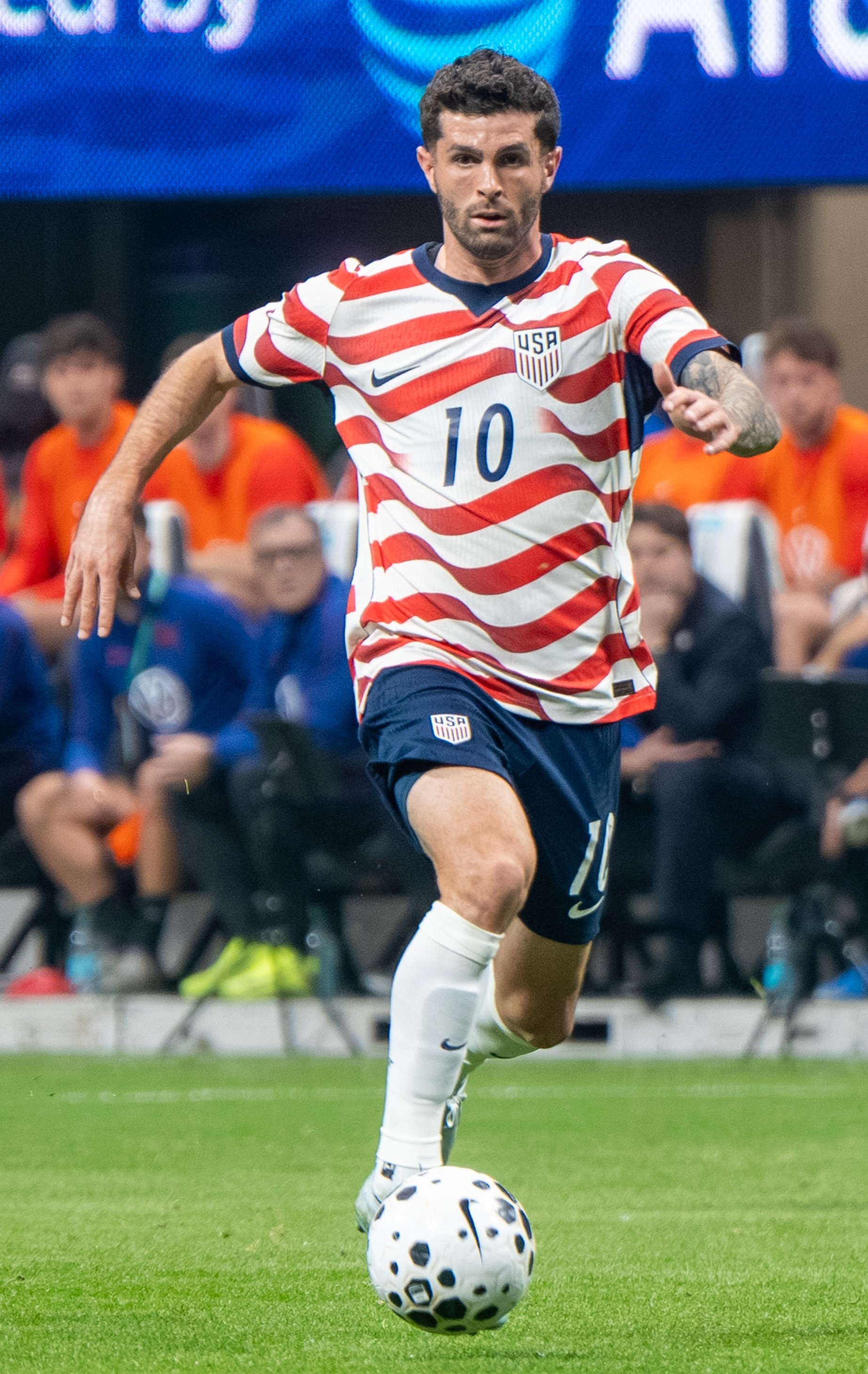
Christian Pulisic

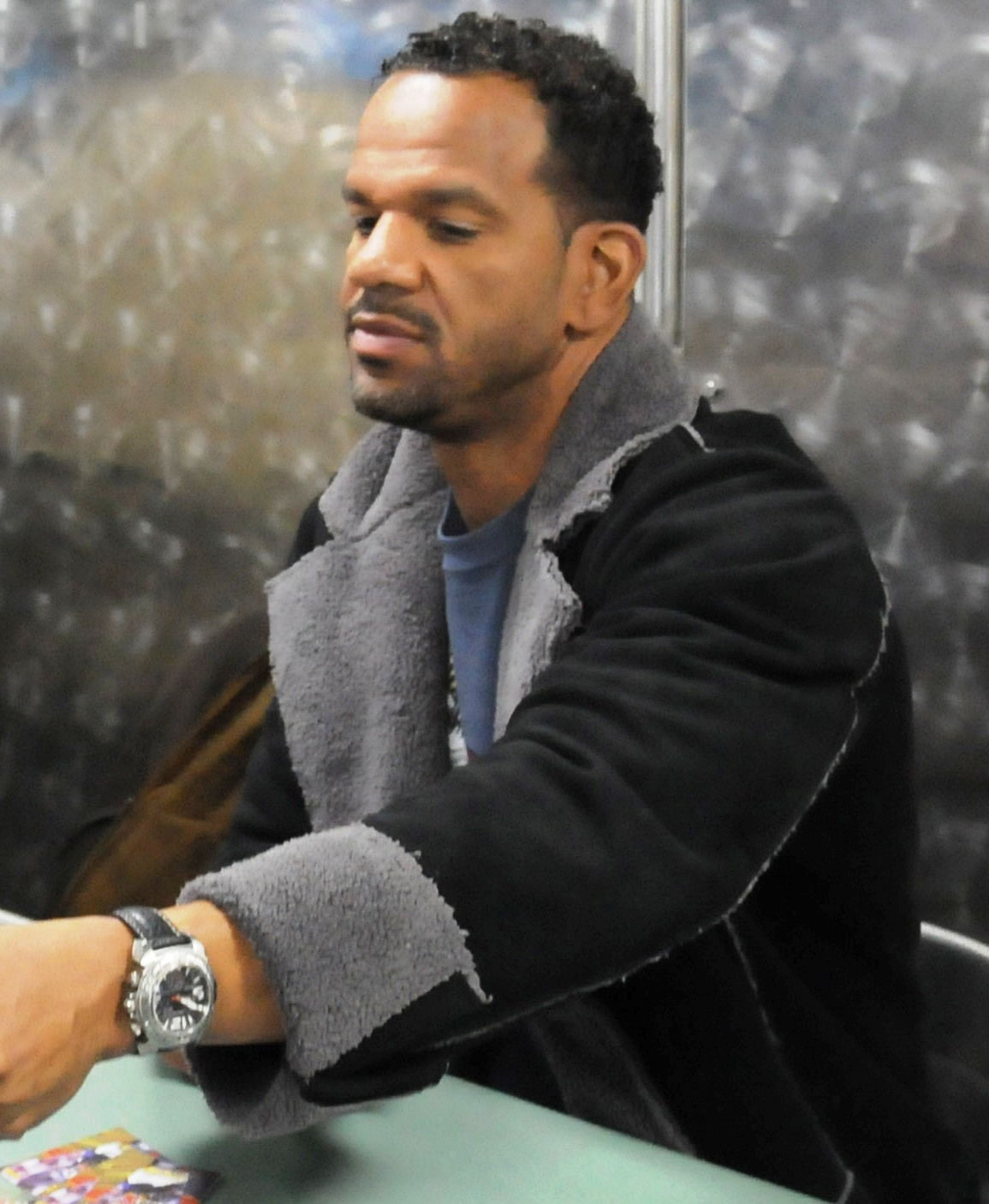
Andre Reed

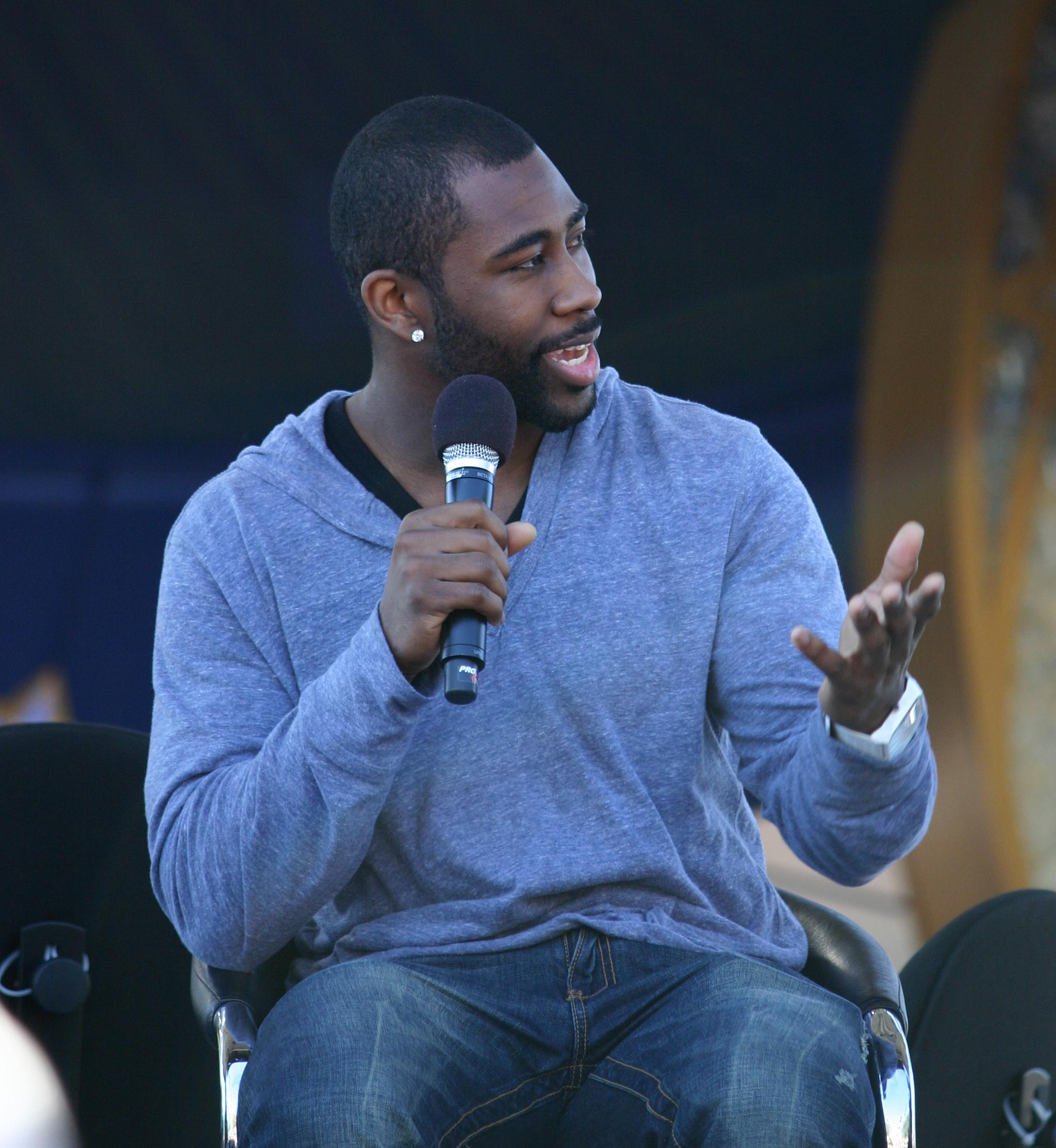
Darrelle Revis

- Joe Namath, HOF professional football player—Beaver Falls
- Bridget Namiotka (born 1990), pairs skater
- Ryan Nassib, professional football player—West Chester
- Jameer Nelson, professional basketball player—Chester
- Lucas Nix, professional football player—Clairton
- Jordan Norwood, professional football player—State College
- Marty Nothstein, professional cyclist, 2000 Olympics gold medalist—Emmaus
- Jared Odrick, professional football player—Lebanon
- Bo Orlando, professional football player—Berwick
- Ben Olsen, professional soccer player and coach—Middletown
- Joe Ostrowski, professional baseball player—West Wyoming
- Ed Ott, professional baseball player—Muncy
- Doug Overton, professional basketball coach—Philadelphia, Pennsylvania
- Billy Owens, professional basketball player—Carlisle
- Arnold Palmer, HOF professional golfer—Latrobe
- George Parros, professional hockey player—Washington
- Sean Payton, professional football head coach for the New Orleans Saints—Philadelphia
- Todd Peck, professional racing driver—Glenville
- Corey Peters, professional football player—Pittsburgh
- Zach Pfeffer (born 1995), soccer player—Dresher
- Mike Piazza, HOF professional baseball player—Norristown
- Bernard Pierce, professional football player—Ardmore
- Jason Pinkston, professional football player—Pittsburgh
- Lousaka Polite, professional football player—North Braddock
- Paul Posluszny, professional football player—Hopewell Township
- Abner Charles Powell, professional baseball player, owner, innovator—Shenandoah
- Terrelle Pryor, professional football player—Jeannette
- Justin Pugh, professional football player—Holland
- Christian Pulisic, professional soccer player—Hershey
- Andre Reed, HOF professional football player—Allentown
- Dylan Reese (born 1984), NHL ice hockey player—Pittsburgh
- Frank Reich, professional football player—Lebanon
- Nolan Reimold, professional baseball player—Greenville
- Nicole Reinhart, professional cyclist—Macungie
- Rocky Reynolds, professional wrestler—Titusville
- Darrelle Revis, professional football player—Aliquippa
- Mike Richter, professional hockey player—Abington
- Garth Rickards, professional racing driver—Mechanicsburg
- Adam Rippon, Olympic bronze medalist in figure skating—Clarks Summit
- Jon Ritchie, professional football player—Mechanicsburg
- Bill Robinson, professional baseball player, coach—McKeesport
- Ed Roebuck, professional baseball player—East Millsboro
- Malik Rose, professional basketball player—Philadelphia
- Mike Rosenthal (born 1977), NFL football player—Pittsburgh
- Tim Ruddy, professional football player—Dunmore
- Bobby Ryan, professional ice hockey player—Philadelphia
- Matt Ryan, professional football player—Exton

S–Z

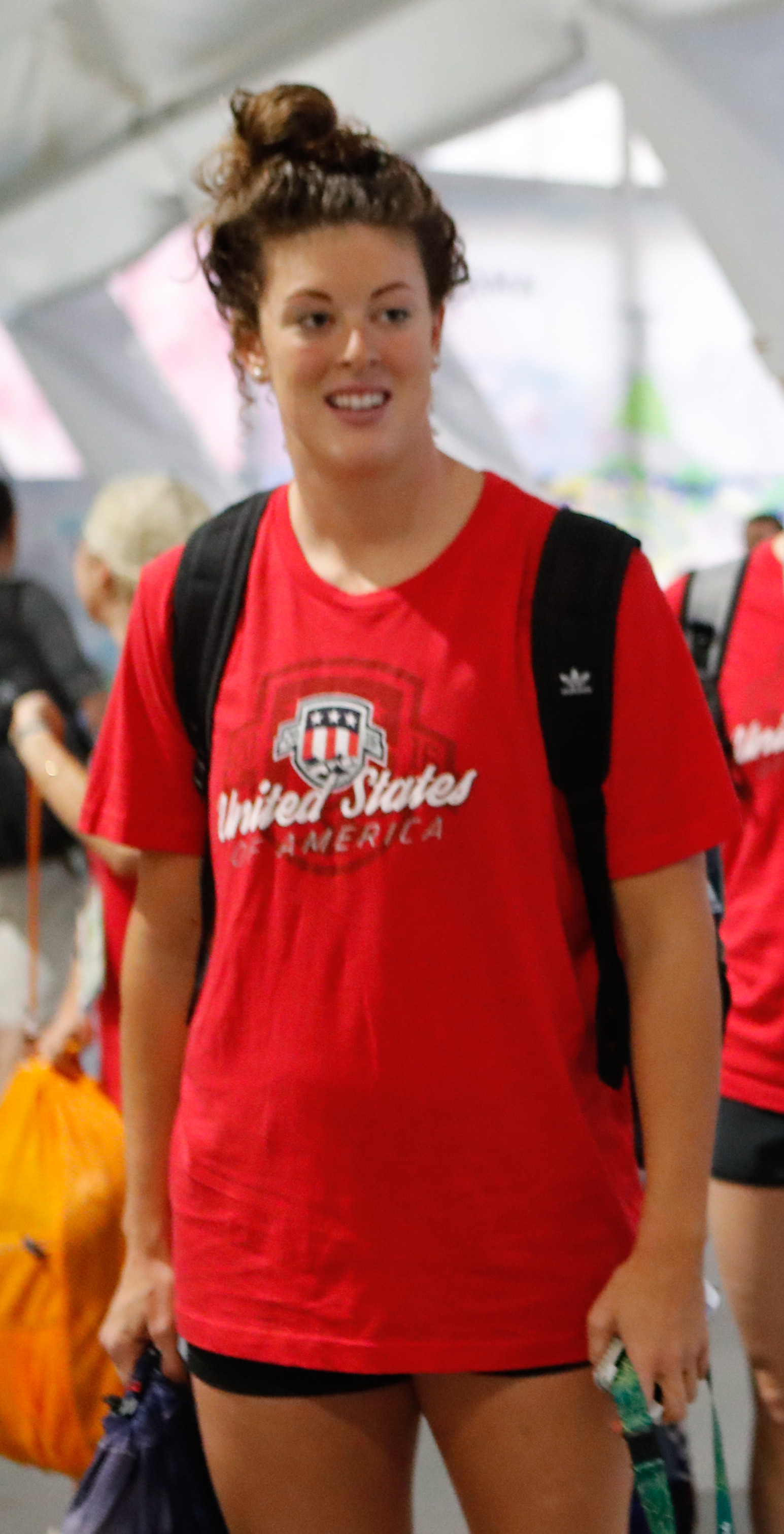
Allison Schmitt

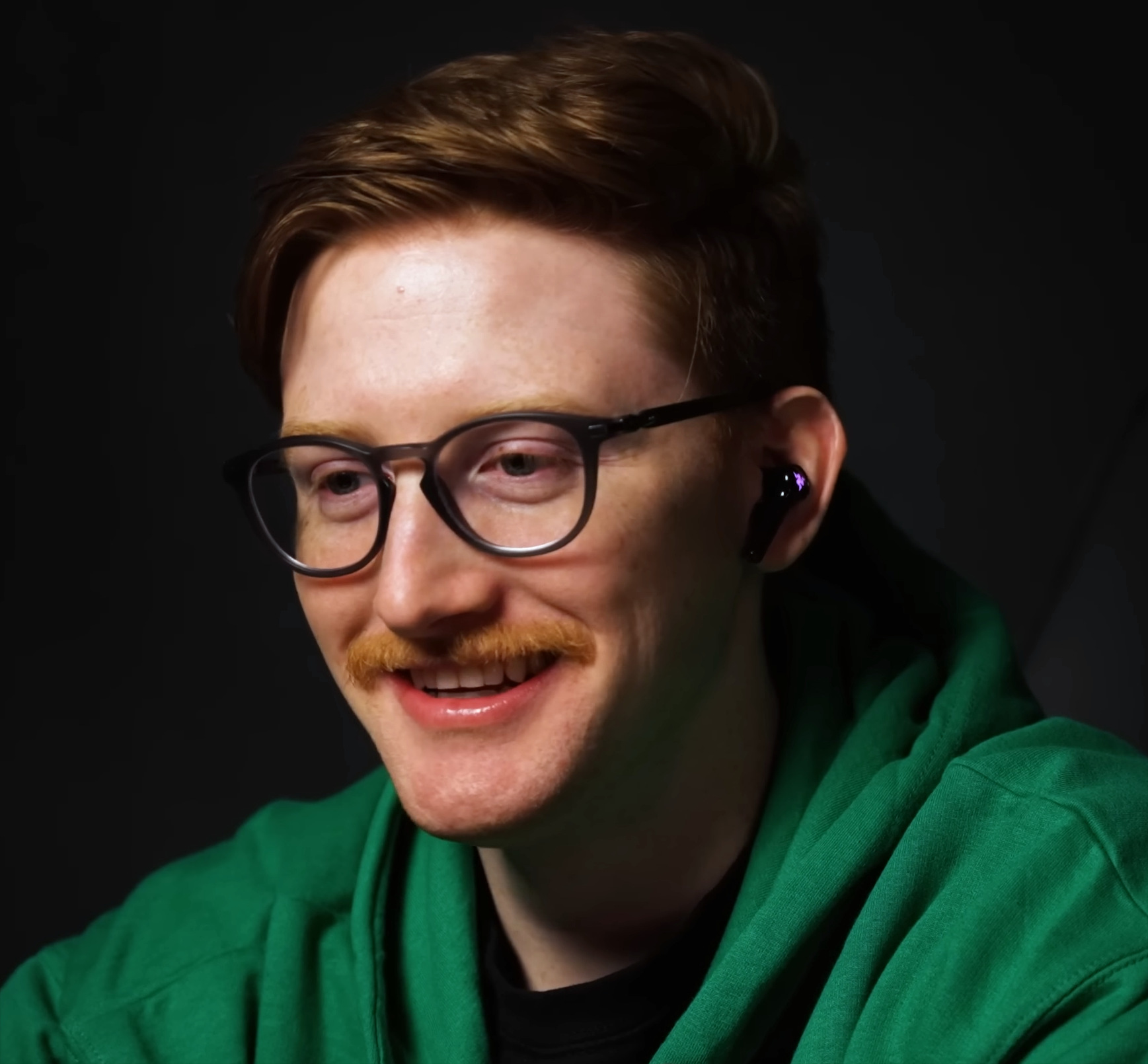
Scump

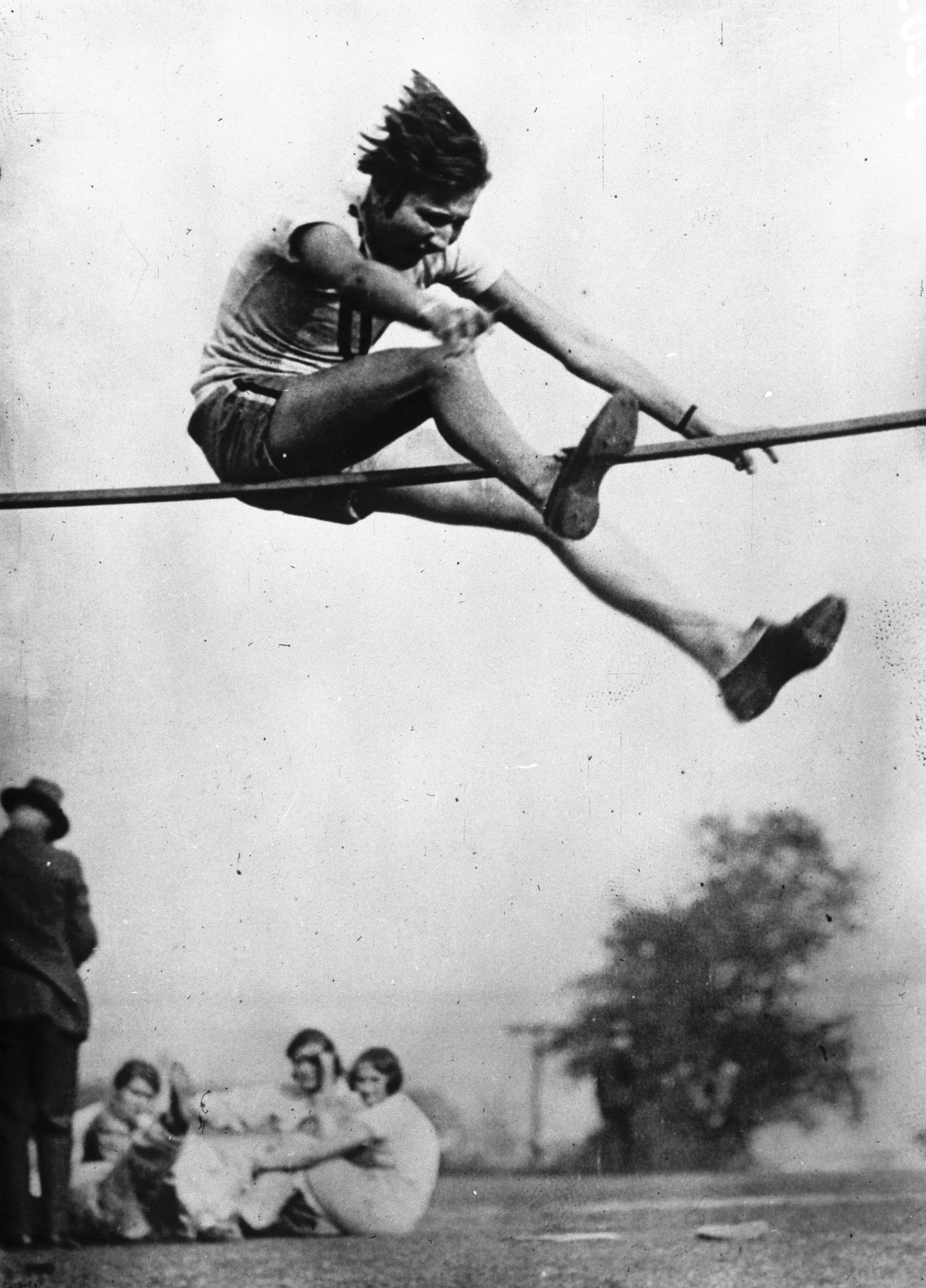
Jean Shiley

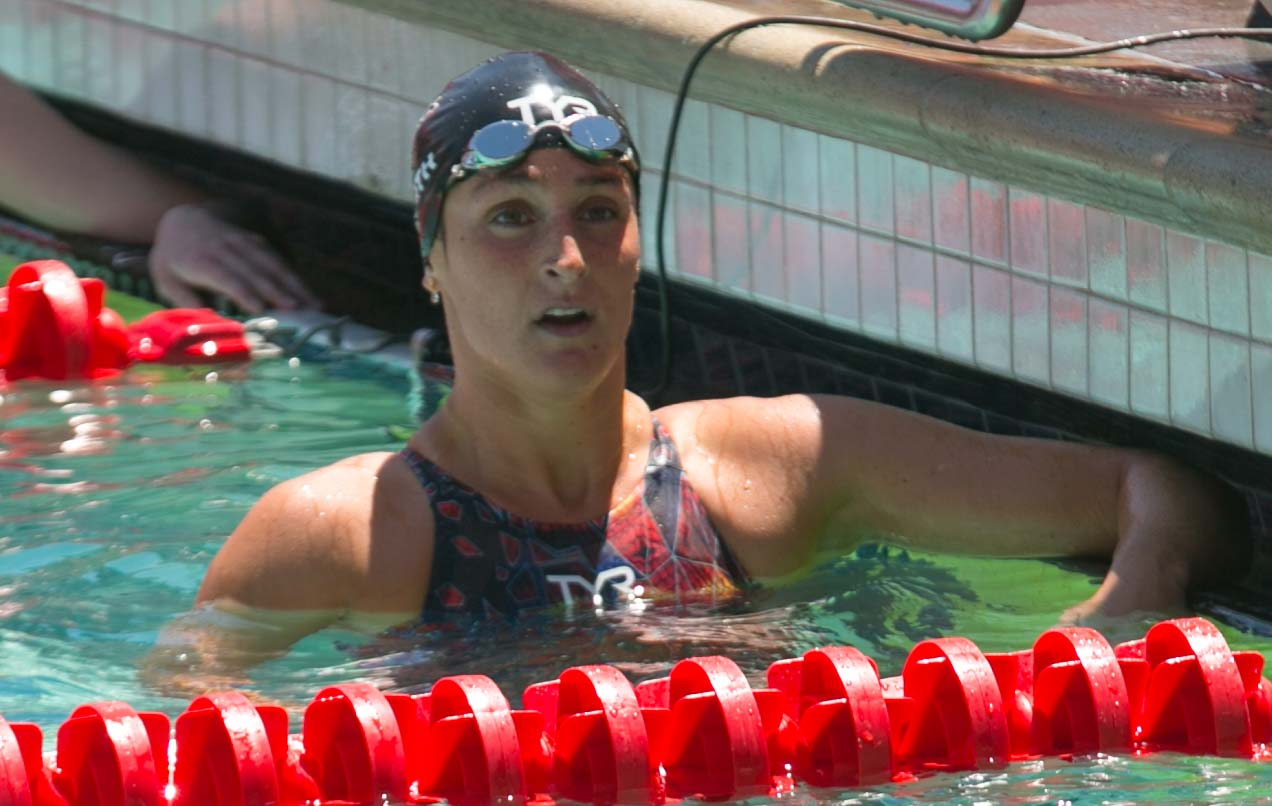
Leah Smith

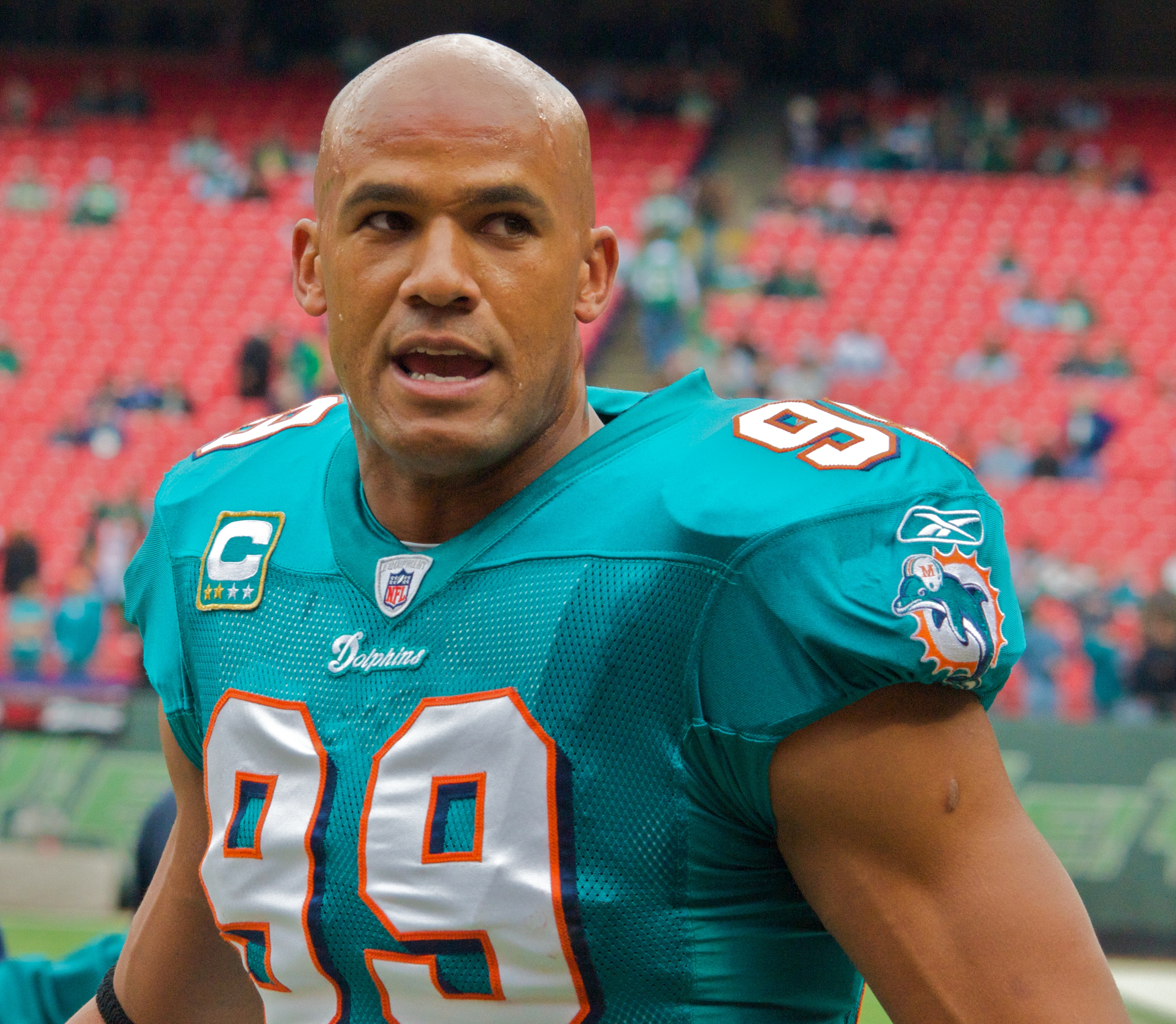
Jason Taylor

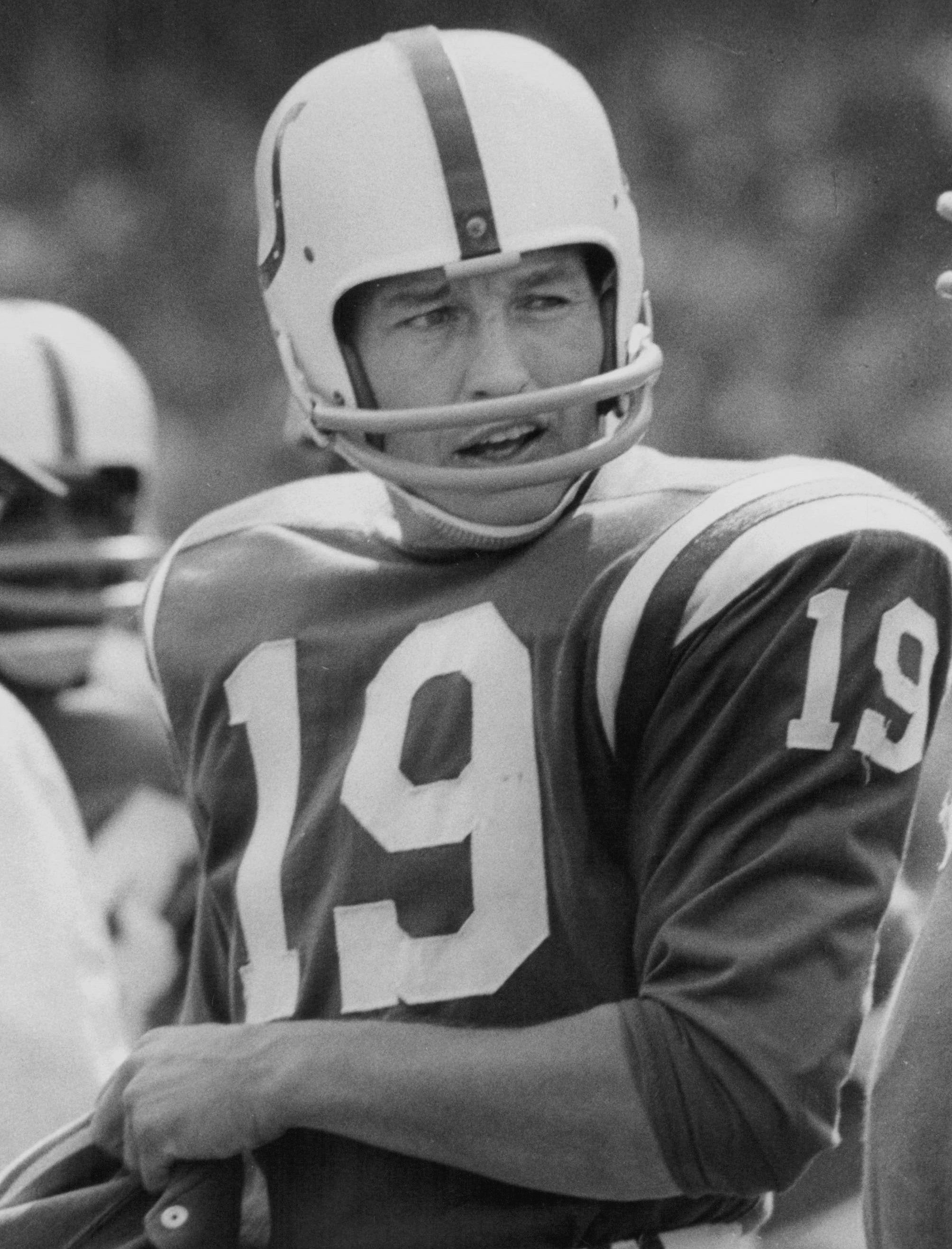
Johnny Unitas

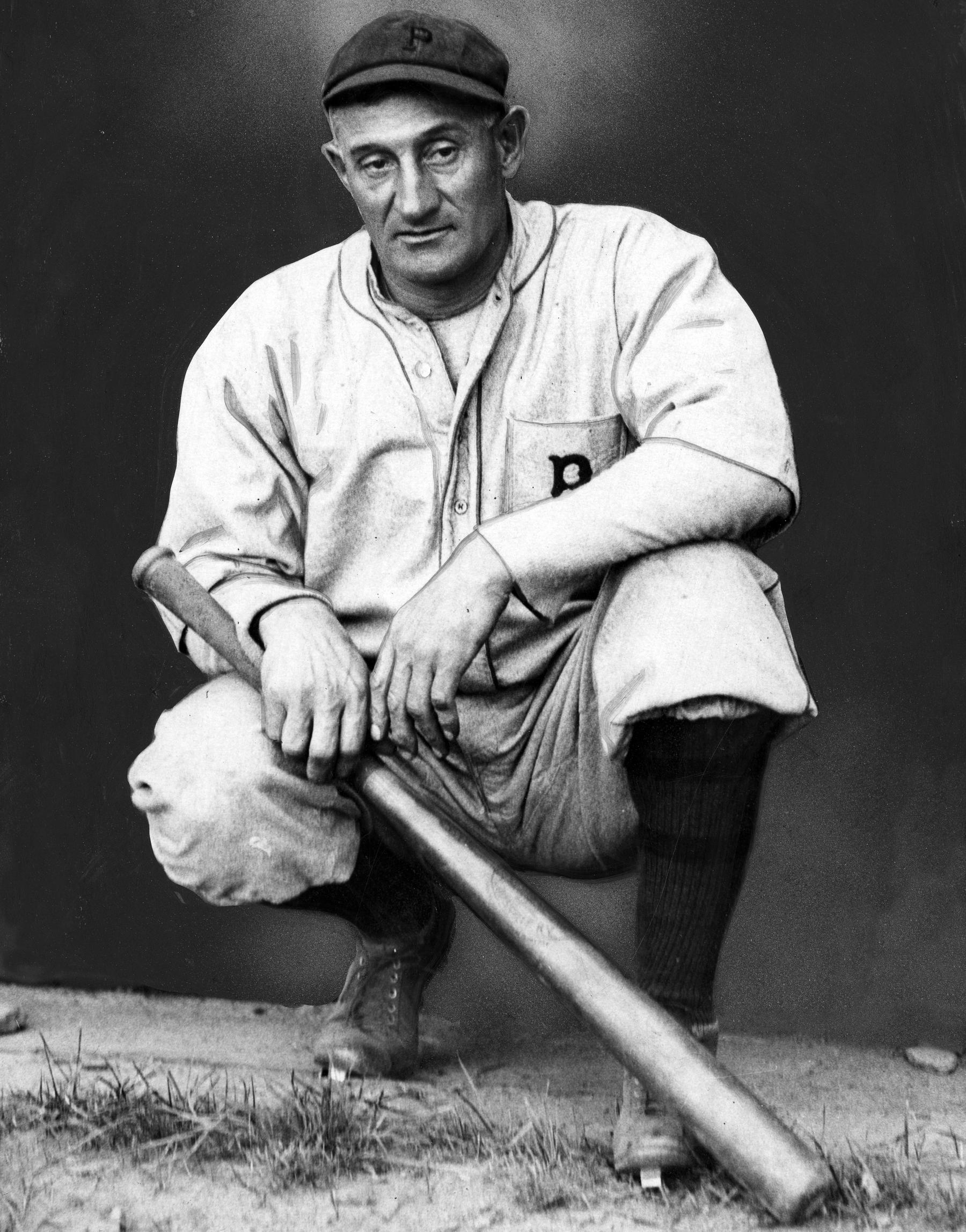
Honus Wagner

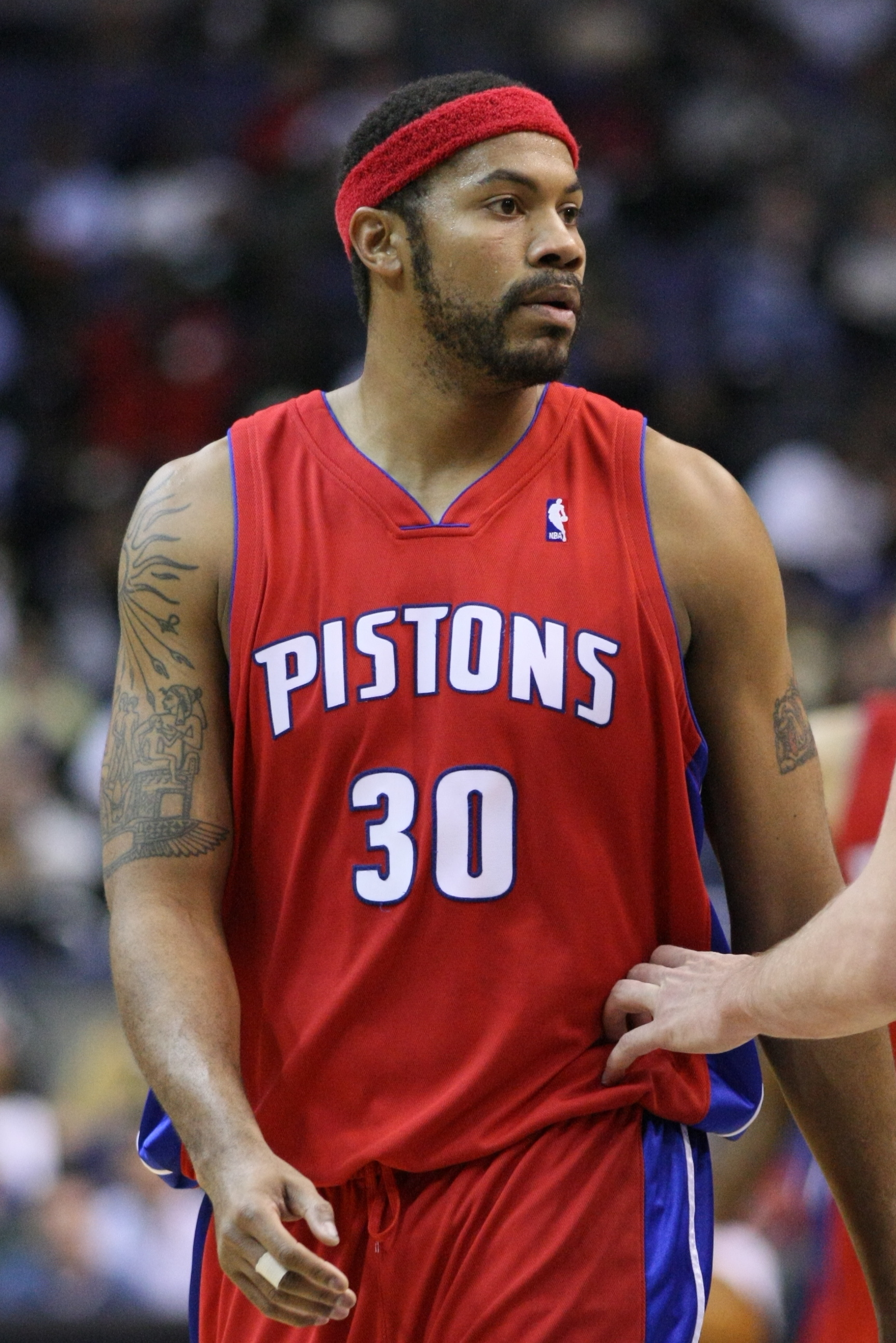
Rasheed Wallace

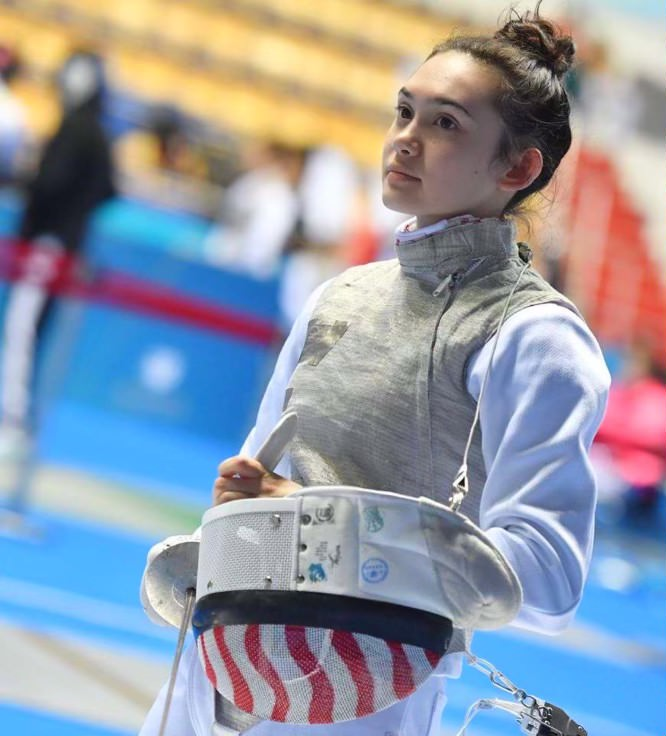
Maia Weintraub

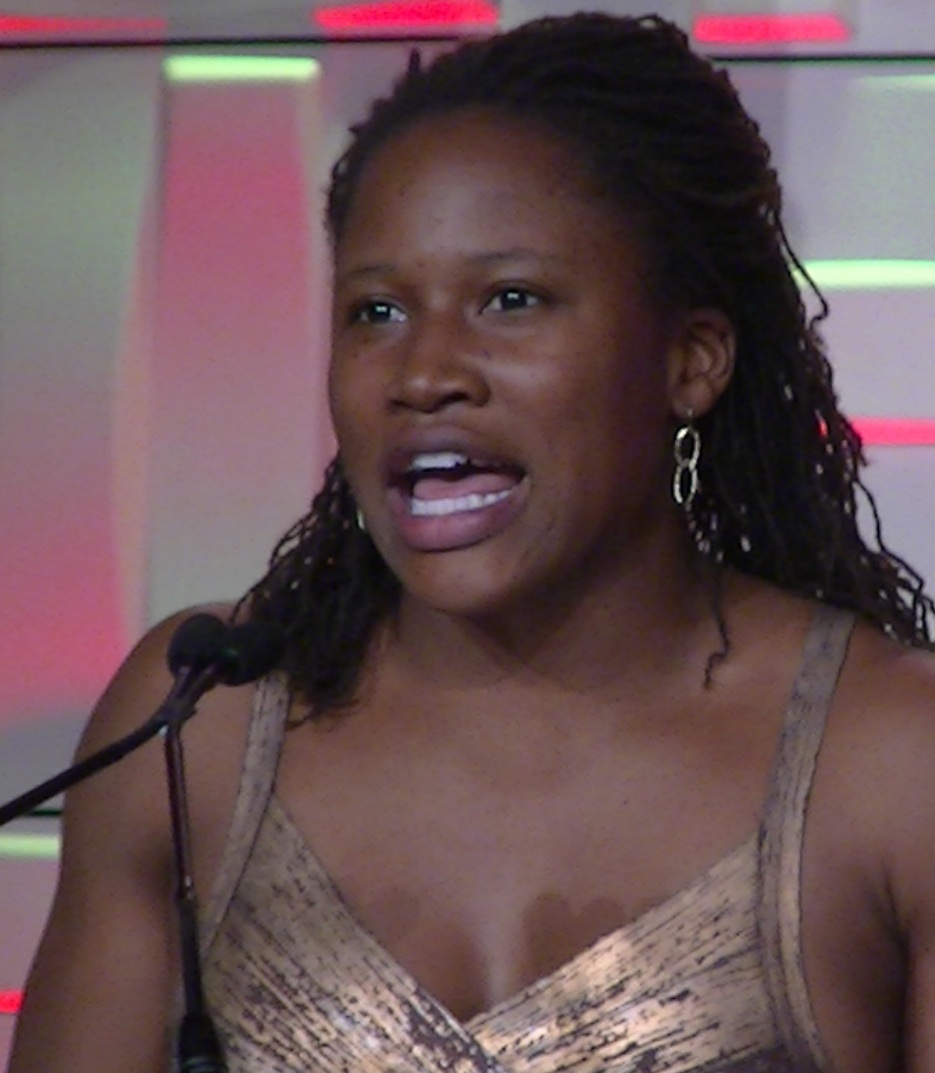
Lauryn Williams

- Brandon Saad, professional hockey player—Pittsburgh
- Jack Sack (1902–1980), football player and coach
- John Salmons, professional basketball player—Philadelphia
- Bruno Sammartino, professional wrestler—Pittsburgh
- Bob Sanders, professional football player—Erie
- Jerry Sandusky, college football coach—Washington
- Carl Sawatski, professional baseball player—Shickshinny
- Matt Schaub, professional football player—Pittsburgh
- Steve Schlachter (born 1954), American-Israeli basketball player—Plymouth Meeting
- Allison Schmitt, Olympic swimmer—Pittsburgh
- Brian Schneider, professional baseball player—Northampton
- Marty Schottenheimer, professional football coach
- Mike Scioscia, professional baseball player and manager—Morton
- Coleman Scott, Olympic bronze medalist in freestyle wrestling—Waynesburg
- Da'Rel Scott, professional football player—Conshohocken
- Scump, professional video gamer–Mechanicsburg
- Vic Seixas (born 1923), professional Hall of Fame tennis player
- Nate Sestina (born 1997), basketball player in the Israeli Basketball Premier League
- Mustafa Shakur, professional basketball player—Philadelphia
- Bobby Shantz, professional baseball player—Pottstown
- Kirk Shelmerdine, NASCAR crew chief and driver—Philadelphia
- Jean Shiley, Olympic track and field gold medalist—Harrisburg
- Dick Shiner, professional football player—Lebanon
- A. Q. Shipley, professional football player—Coraopolis
- Tom Skladany, professional football player—Bethel Park
- Greg Skrepenak, professional football player—Wilkes Barre
- Steve Slaton, professional football player—Levittown
- Kevin Slowey, professional baseball player—Upper St. Clair
- Leah Smith, Olympic gold medalist swimmer–Pittsburgh
- Musa Smith, professional football player—New Bloomfield
- Garrett Smithley, professional racing driver—Ligonier
- Gene Snitsky, professional wrestler—Nesquehoning
- Frank Spellman (1922–2017), Olympic champion weightlifter—Malvern, Philadelphia, York
- Jimmy Spencer, professional racecar driver—Berwick
- Shawntae Spencer, professional football player—Rankin
- Eddie Stanky, professional baseball player and manager—Philadelphia
- LaRod Stephens-Howling, professional football player—Johnstown
- Mark Stepnoski, professional football player—Erie
- Tony Stewart, professional football player—Allentown
- Devin Street, professional football player—Bethlehem
- Ross Stripling, professional baseball player—Blue Bell
- Big John Studd, professional wrestler—Butler
- Joe Stydahar, professional football player and coach—Kaylor
- Matt Suhey, professional football player—Bellefonte
- Bob Sura, professional basketball player—Wilkes-Barre
- Bruce Sutter, HOF professional baseball player—Lancaster
- Chuck Tanner, professional baseball player and manager—New Castle
- Jason Taylor, professional football player—Pittsburgh
- Ray Tesser, professional football player—Titusville
- Walter Tewksbury, Olympian track and field athlete—Ashley
- Jaimie Thomas, professional football player—Harrisburg
- Myles Thomas, professional baseball player—State College
- Carol Semple Thompson, amateur golfer—Sewickley
- Jim Thorpe, various—Carlisle, only connected posthumously to borough of Jim Thorpe
- Jim Tomsula, professional football coach—Homestead
- Wallace Triplett, professional football player—Cheltenham Township
- Charley Trippi, HOF professional football player—Pittston
- Bob Tucker, professional football player—Hazleton
- Emlen Tunnell, HOF professional football player—Bryn Mawr
- Dave Twardzik, professional basketball player—Middletown
- R.J. Umberger, professional hockey player—Pittsburgh
- Johnny Unitas, HOF professional football player—Pittsburgh
- Josie Valeri, professional soccer player and scholar — Pittsburgh
- Mickey Vernon, professional baseball player—Marcus Hook
- Iosif Vitebskiy (born 1938), Soviet Ukrainian Olympic medalist and world champion épée fencer and fencing coach—Philadelphia
- Honus Wagner, HOF professional baseball player—Chartiers Township
- Dion Waiters, professional basketball player—Philadelphia
- Christian Walker, professional baseball player—Norristown
- Lonnie Walker IV (born 1998), professional basketball player for Maccabi Tel Aviv, previously the Brooklyn Nets—Reading
- Neil Walker, professional baseball player—Pittsburgh
- Art Wall Jr., professional golfer—Honesdale
- Rasheed Wallace, professional basketball player—Philadelphia
- Ed Walsh, HOF professional baseball player—Plains Township
- Joe Walton, professional football coach—Beaver Falls
- Hakim Warrick, professional basketball player—Philadelphia
- Earl Watford, professional football player—Philadelphia
- Kenny Watson, professional football player—Harrisburg
- Ricky Watters, professional football player—Harrisburg
- Bobby Weaver, Olympic gold medal freestyle wrestler—Easton
- Reggie Wells, professional football player—South Park
- Maia Weintraub (born 2002), national champion and Olympic foil fencer
- Johnny Weir, professional and Olympic figure skater—Coatesville
- Randy White, HOF professional football player—Pittsburgh
- Brian Williams, professional football player—Mt. Lebanon
- Early Williams (born 1951), American-Israeli basketball player
- Lauryn Williams, Summer and Winter Olympic medalist—Rochester
- Allie Wilson (born 1996), American middle-distance runner—Wallingford
- Josh Wilson, professional baseball player—Mt. Lebanon
- Kris Wilson, professional football player—Harrisburg
- Coy Wire, professional football player—Camp Hill—Cedar Cliff
- Stefen Wisniewski, professional football player—Pittsburgh
- Lee Woodall, professional football player—Carlisle
- Tom Woodeshick, professional football player—Wilkes-Barre
- John Woodruff, Olympic gold medalist in track and field—Connellsville
- Blidi Wreh-Wilson, professional football player—Edinboro
- Kris Wright, NASCAR driver—Pittsburgh
- Frank Wycheck, professional football player—Philadelphia
- Trey Yesavage, professional football player—Pottstown
- Michael Young (born 1994), basketball player for Ironi Nahariya of the Israeli Basketball Premier League—Pittsburgh
- Stephen Zack, basketball player—New Cumberland
- Mackenzie Ziegler, actor, featured dancer on Dance Moms—Murrysville
- Maddie Ziegler, actor, featured dancer on Dance Moms—Murrysville

== Authors, playwrights, and writers ==
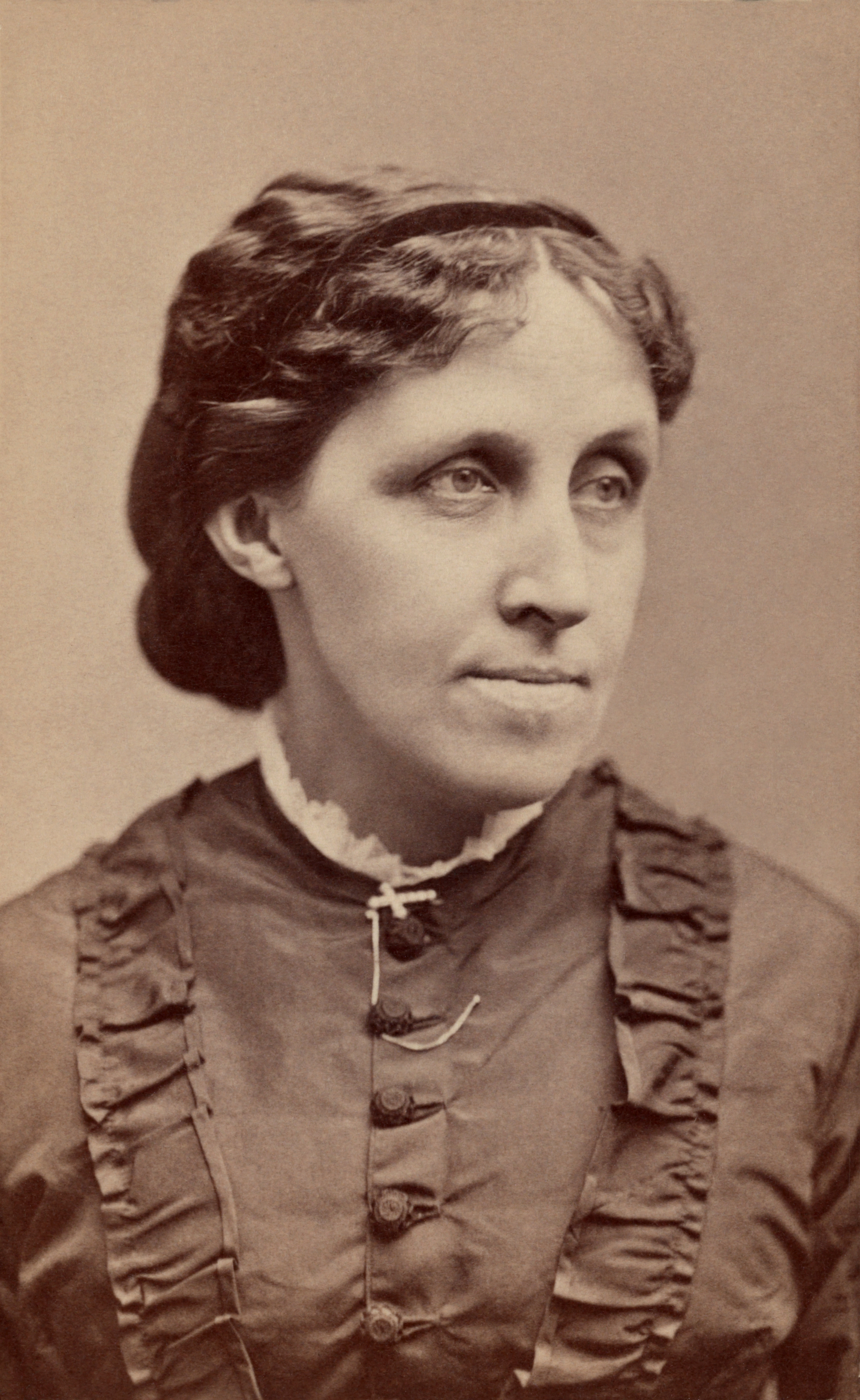
Louisa May Alcott

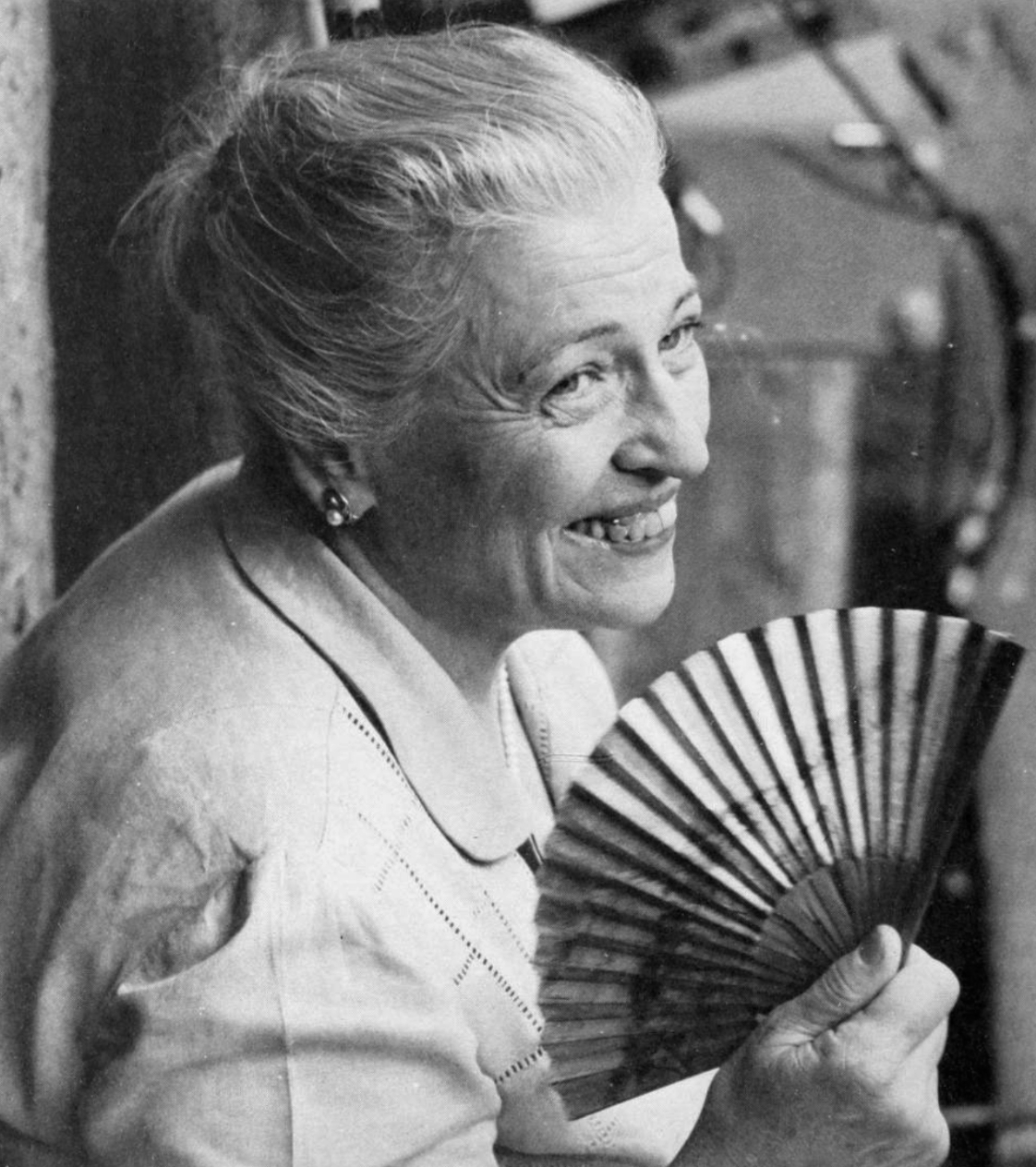
Pearl S. Buck

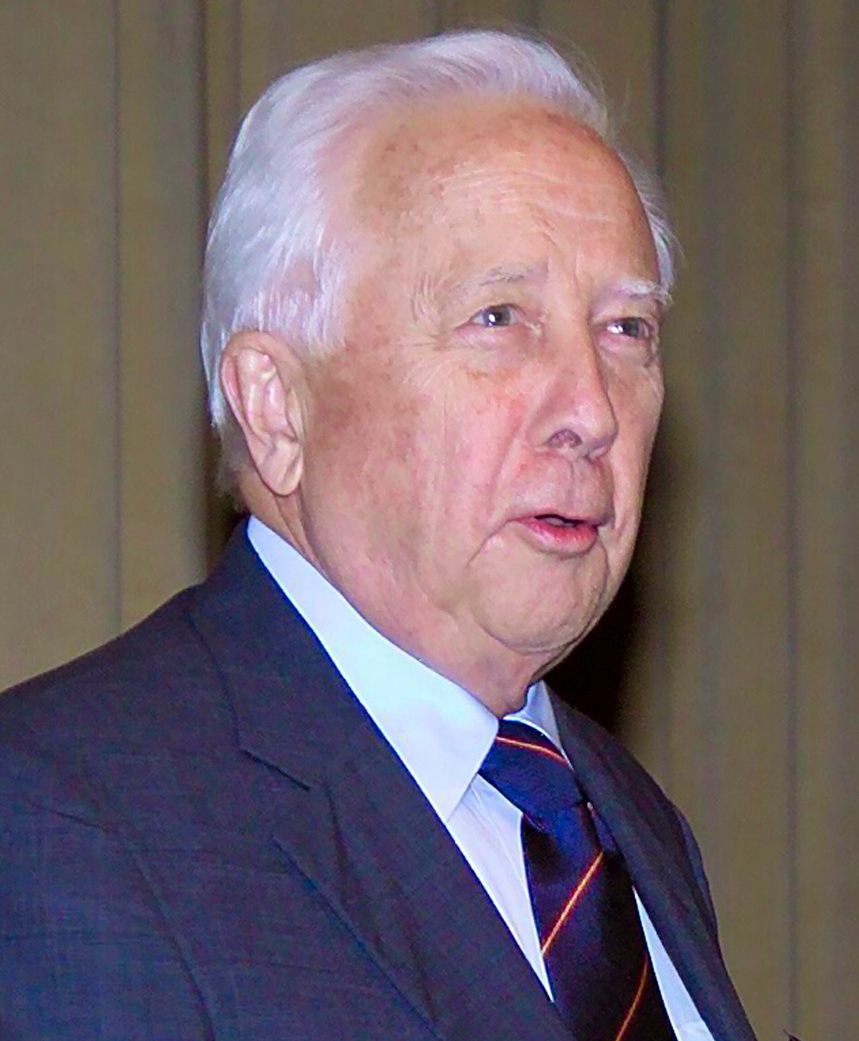
David McCullough

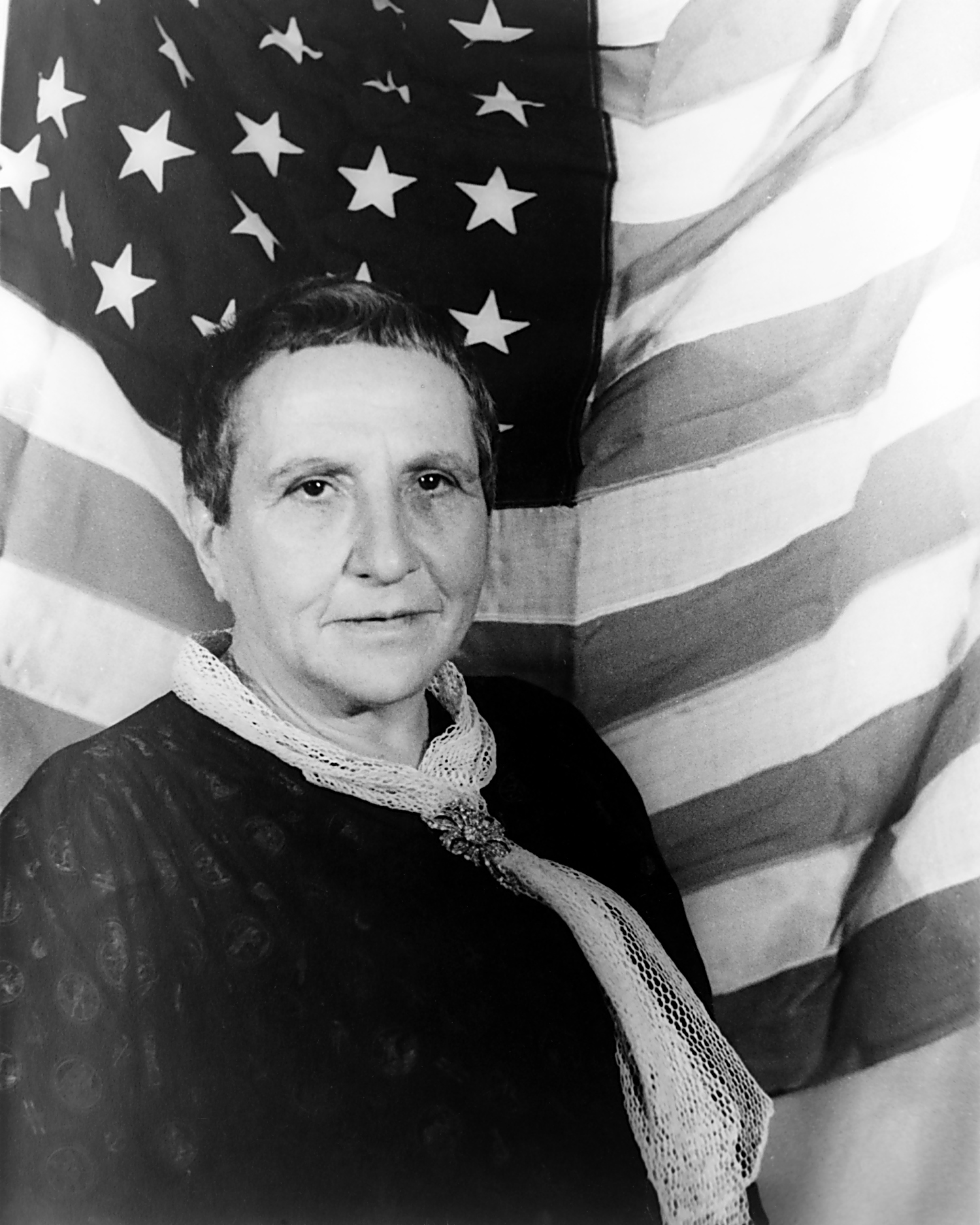
Gertrude Stein

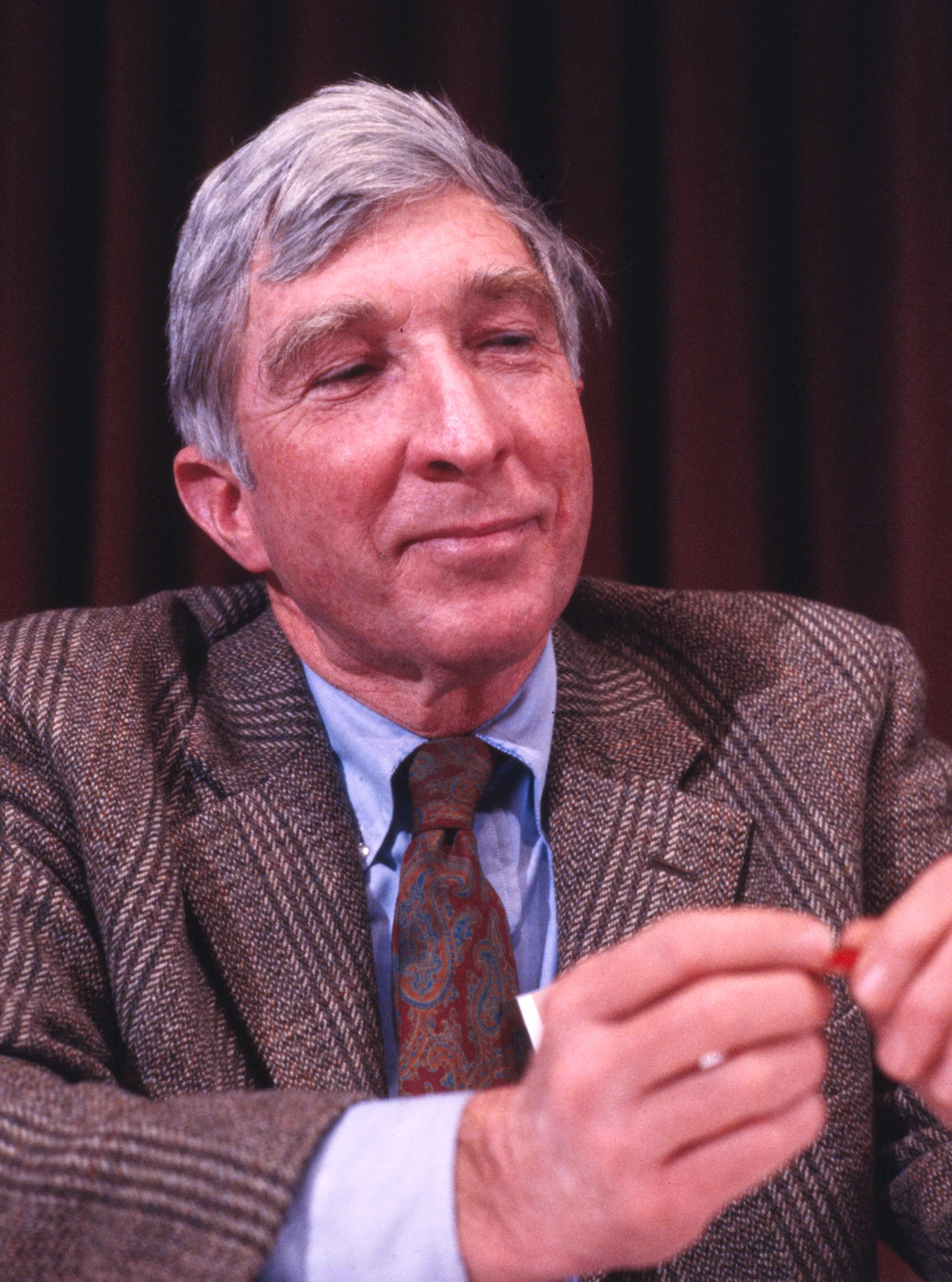
John Updike

- Edward Abbey—Indiana
- Louisa May Alcott—Germantown
- Lloyd Alexander—Philadelphia
- George Anastasia—Philadelphia
- Maxwell Anderson—Atlantic
- Poul Anderson—Bristol
- Janet Asimov—Ashland
- Mary Canfield Ballard—Troy
- Samuel Barber—West Chester
- Donald Barthelme—Philadelphia
- Ellen Bass—Philadelphia
- John Batchelor—Bryn Mawr / Lower Merion Township
- Mary Temple Bayard—Waynesburg
- Adaline Hohf Beery—Hanover
- Stan and Jan Berenstain—Philadelphia
- Ben Bova—Philadelphia
- Mary D. R. Boyd—Philadelphia
- Anna Braden—Montgomery
- Pearl S. Buck—Perkasie
- Charles Brockden Brown—Philadelphia
- Bebe Moore Campbell—Philadelphia
- Francesca Anna Canfield–—Philadelphia
- Rachel Carson—Springdale
- Diana Cavallo—Philadelphia
- Stephen Chbosky—Pittsburgh
- Helen Taggart Clark—Northumberland
- Mary M. Cohen—Philadelphia
- Marc Connelly—McKeesport
- Michael Connelly—Philadelphia
- Margaret Deland—Allegheny
- Annie Dillard—Pittsburgh
- Ella Hamilton Durley—Harrisville
- Tristan Egolf—Lancaster
- Robert Fagles—Philadelphia
- Stephen Flaherty—Pittsburgh
- Harvey Flink—Centre Hall
- Tom Flynn—Erie
- Nancy Friday—Pittsburgh
- David Fulmer—Northumberland
- Todd Gallagher—Greensburg
- Walter B. Gibson—Philadelphia
- Carmen Gentile—New Kensington
- Jim Goad—Ridley Park
- Steve Gordon—Chester
- Jane Lewers Gray—Easton
- H.D. (Hilda Doolittle)—Bethlehem
- Oscar Hammerstein II—Doylestown
- Lucy Hamilton Hooper—Philadelphia
- Emeline Harriet Howe—West Hickory
- Kristin Hunter—Philadelphia
- Woody Jackson—Oil City
- Thomas Allibone Janvier—Philadelphia
- Robert T. Jeschonek—Johnstown
- Kait Kerrigan—Kingston
- Dean Koontz—Everett
- David Leavitt—Pittsburgh
- Marguerite St. Leon Loud—Wysox
- Bree Lowdermilk—Wallingford
- John D. MacDonald—Sharon
- Edith May—Philadelphia
- David McCullough—Pittsburgh
- Henry Meyer—Centre County
- James A. Michener—Doylestown
- Jason Miller—Scranton
- Susanne Vandegrift Moore—Bucks County
- James Morrow—Philadelphia
- Lance Morrow—Philadelphia
- John O'Hara—Pottsville
- Ralph Peters—Pottsville / Schuylkill Haven
- Robert W. Peterson—Warren
- Darryl Ponicsan—Shenandoah
- Ezra Pound—Wyncote
- Conrad Richter—Pine Grove
- Mary Rinehart—Pittsburgh
- Julia H. Scott—Sheshequin
- Lisa Scottoline—Philadelphia
- Sara Shepard—Downingtown
- Dora Adele Shoemaker—Philadelphia
- Luella Dowd Smith—Sheffield
- Martin Cruz Smith—Reading
- Stephen Sondheim—Doylestown
- Jerry Spinelli—Norristown
- Jerry Stahl—Pittsburgh
- Gertrude Stein—Allegheny
- Gerald Stern—Pittsburgh
- Wallace Stevens—Reading
- Ida Tarbell—Titusville
- Bayard Taylor—Chester County
- Eva Griffith Thompson—Jennersville
- John Updike—Reading
- Ellen Oliver Van Fleet—Troy
- Judith Vollmer—Pittsburgh
- Sarah Stokes Walton—Philadelphia
- Jeannette H. Walworth–—Philadelphia
- Joseph Wambaugh–—East Pittsburgh
- Catharine H. Waterman—Philadelphia
- Lauren Weisberger—Allentown
- John Edgar Wideman—Pittsburgh
- Marianne Wiggins—Lancaster
- August Wilson—Pittsburgh
- Owen Wister—Philadelphia
- Jeffrey Zaslow—Broomall
- Calvin Ziegler—Rebersburg

== Computer scientists and mathematicians ==
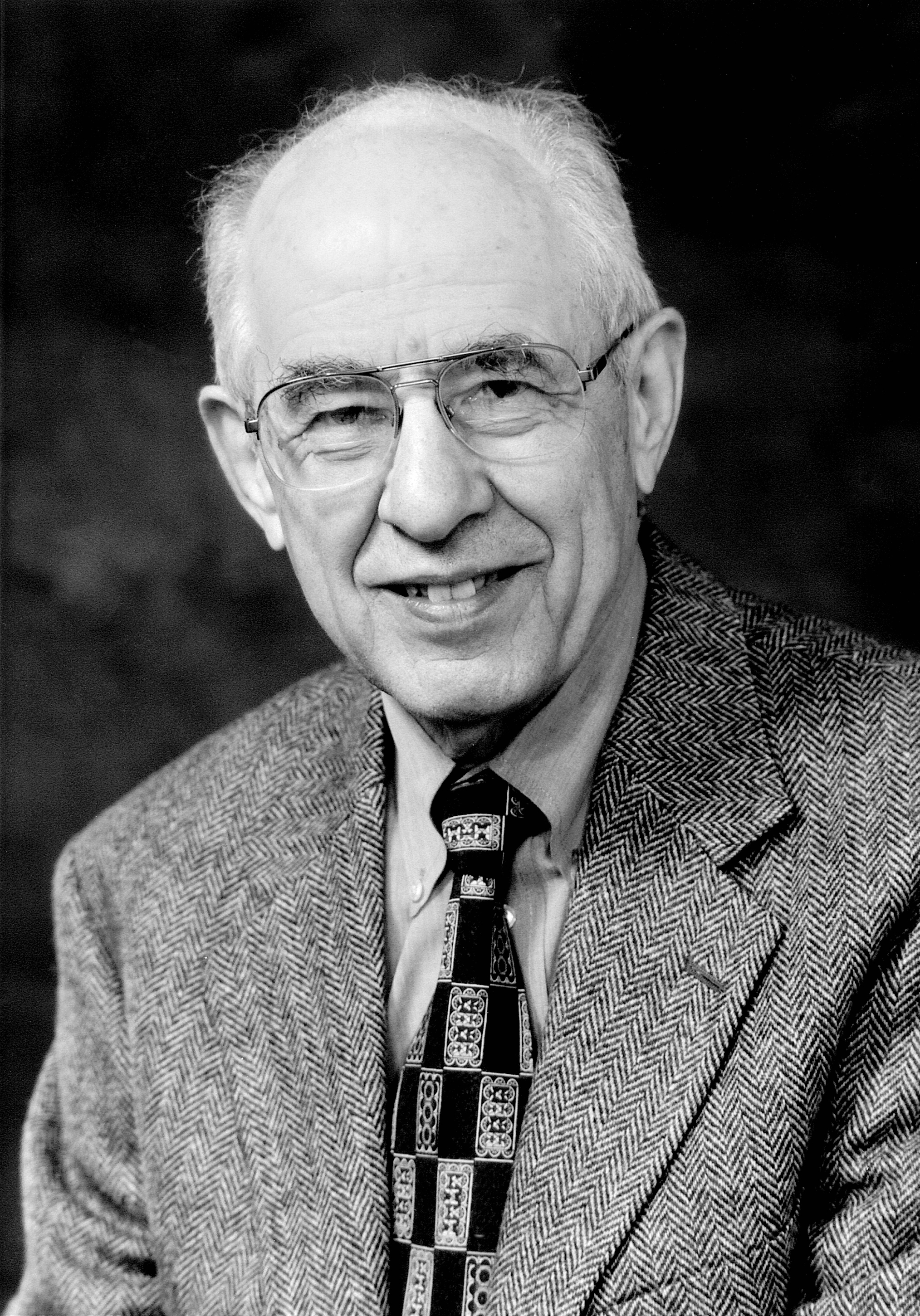
Hilary Putnam

- Scott Aaronson—Philadelphia
- John Backus—Philadelphia
- David Bader—Bethlehem
- Brendan Eich—Pittsburgh
- Martin Charles Golumbic—Erie
- Emil Grosswald—Narberth
- William Draper Harkins—Titusville
- Chad Hurley—Birdsboro
- Oliver Dimon Kellogg—Linwood
- Alan Kotok—Philadelphia
- Michael L. Littman—Philadelphia
- Alan Perlis—Pittsburgh
- Hilary Putnam—Philadelphia
- Jeffrey Shallit—Philadelphia
- George Stibitz—York
- E. Roy Weintraub—Philadelphia

== Conservationists ==
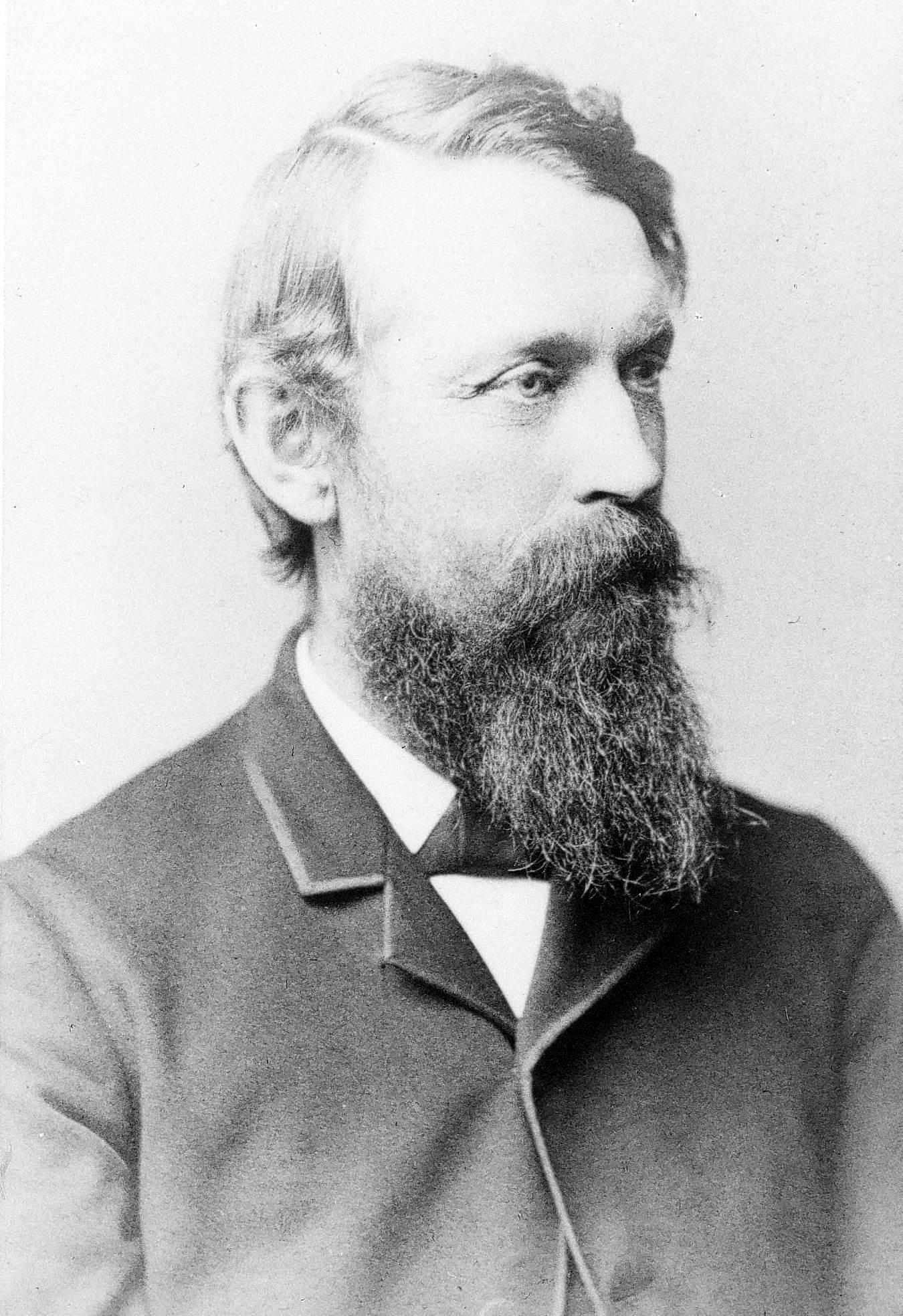
Joseph Rothrock

- Charles Babcock—Oil City
- Rachel Carson—Springdale
- Paul R. Ehrlich—Germantown
- Inky Moore—Newville
- Joseph Rothrock—McVeytown
- Howard Zahniser—Franklin

== Criminals ==
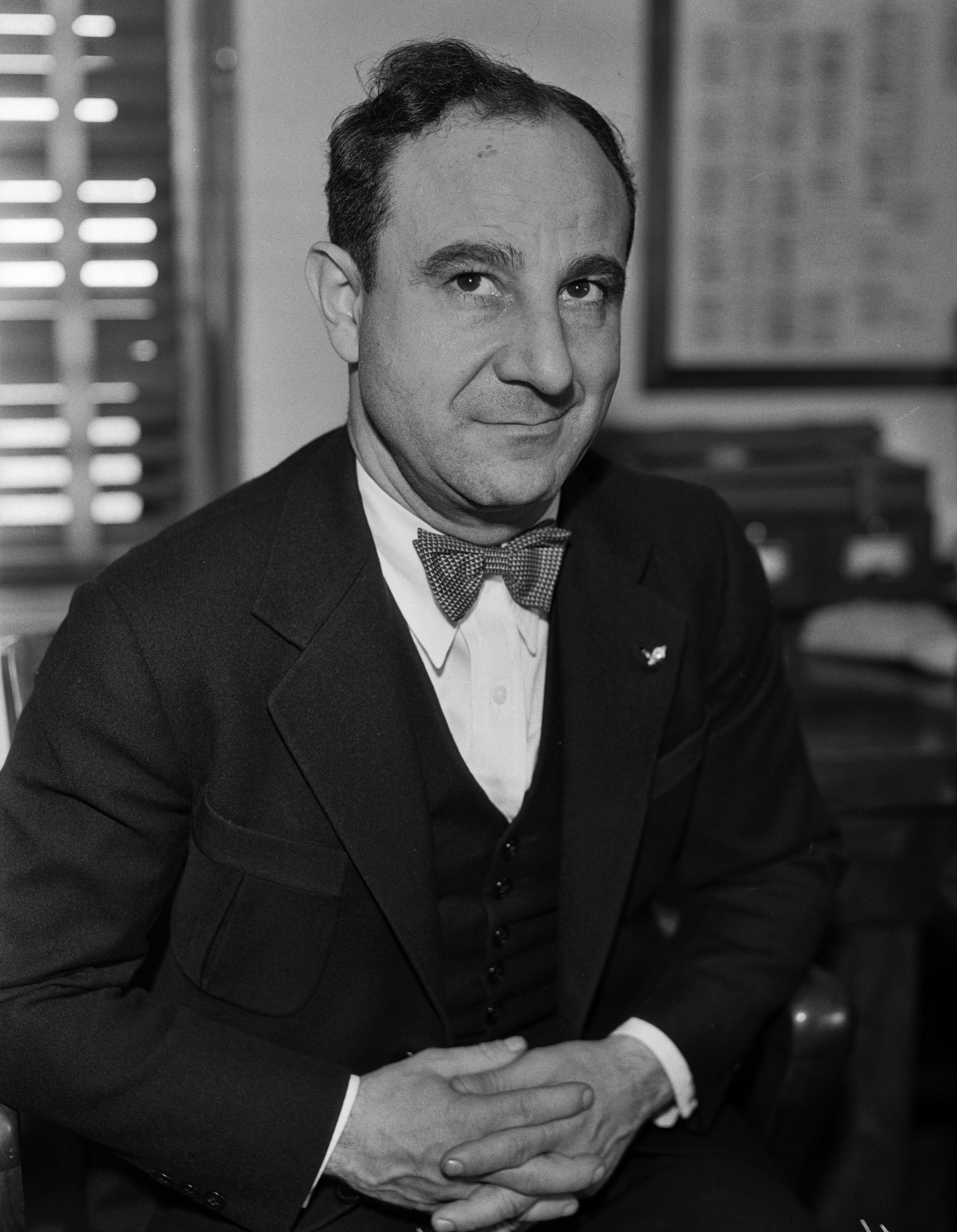
Max Hoff

- Mumia Abu-Jamal—Philadelphia
- George Banks—Wilkes-Barre
- Richard Baumhammers—Pittsburgh
- Angelo Bruno—Philadelphia
- Samuel Byck—Philadelphia
- Janet Danahey—Greenville
- Andrew Thomas DelGiorno—Philadelphia
- Legs Diamond—Philadelphia
- Mickey Duffy—Philadelphia
- Ira Einhorn—Philadelphia
- Caleb Fairley—Gulph Mills
- George Feigley—Harrisburg
- Eric Frein—Canadensis
- Kermit Gosnell—Philadelphia
- Gary M. Heidnik—Philadelphia
- Maxie "Boo Boo" Hoff—Philadelphia
- Eddie James—Bristol
- Joseph Kallinger—Philadelphia
- Bryan Kohberger—Albrightsville
- Timothy Krajcir—West Mahanoy
- Alec Devon Kreider—Lancaster County
- Ignatius Lanzetta—Philadelphia
- Leo Lanzetta—Philadelphia
- John LaRocca—Indiana County
- Joey Merlino—Philadelphia
- Ryan Samsel—Bucks County
- Jerry Sandusky—Washington
- Frank "The Irishman" Sheeran—Darby
- Sundance Kid—Mont Clare
- Philip Testa—Philadelphia
- Salvatore Testa—Philadelphia

== Educators ==
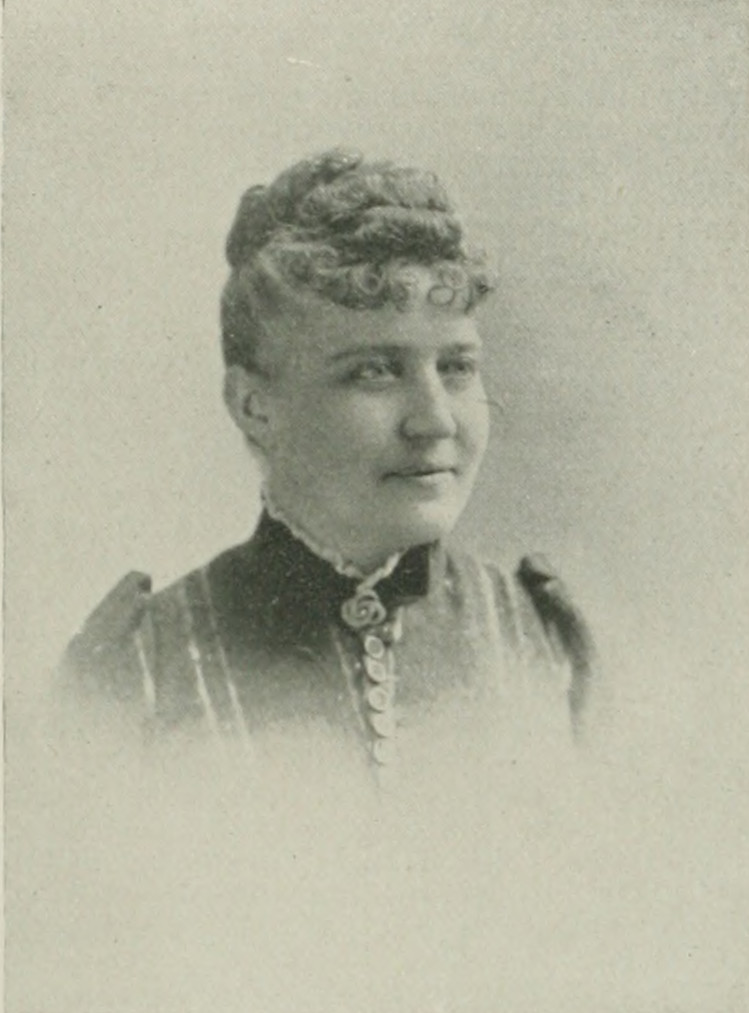
Mary Chandler Atherton

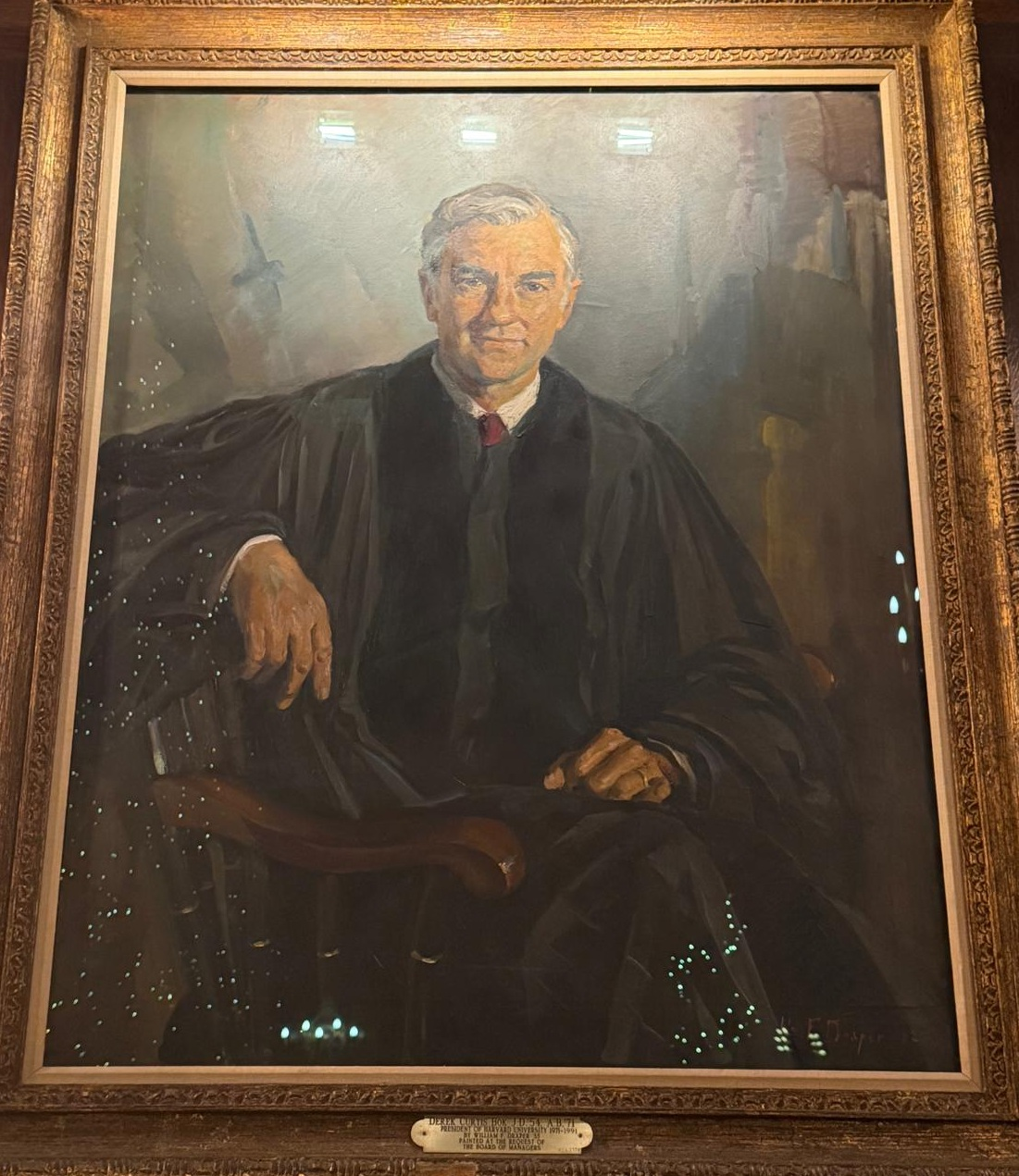
Derek Bok

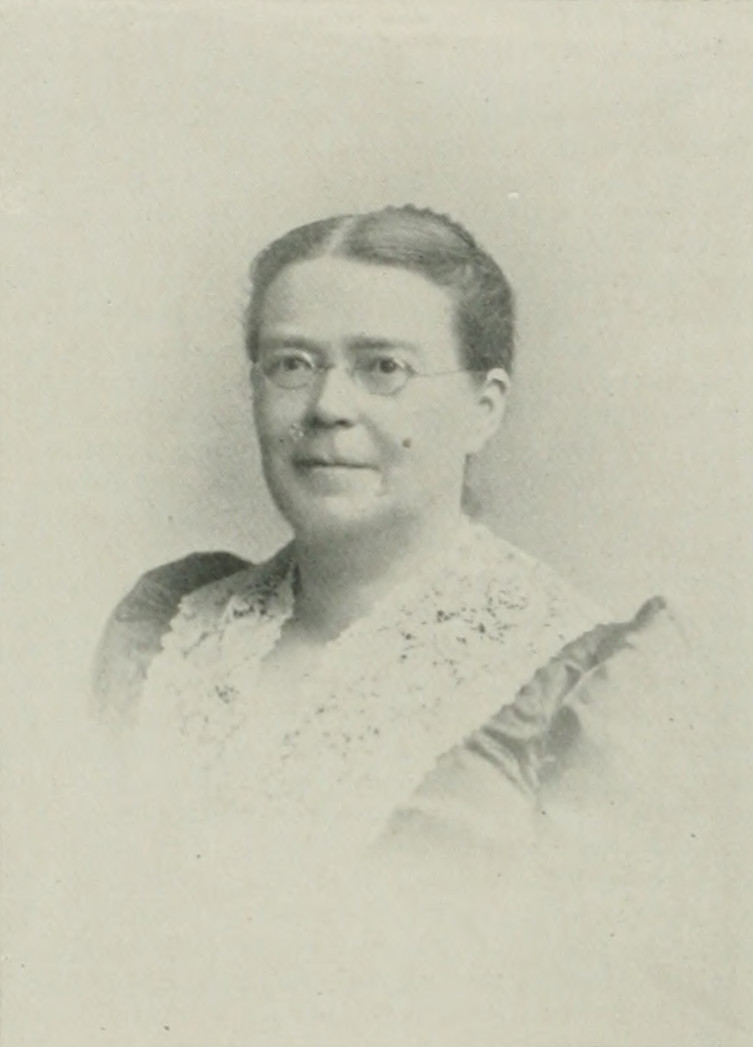
Julia A. Orum

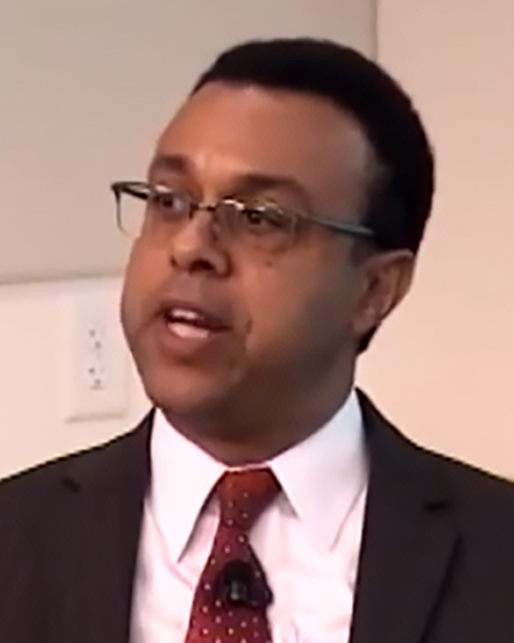
Wendell Pritchett

- Mary Alderson Chandler Atherton (1849–1934), founder, Chandler Normal Shorthand School, chiefly for the training of teachers, the first school of its kind in the world
- Robert Balling, professor of geography, Arizona State University—Uniontown
- Algernon Sydney Biddle (1847–1891), lawyer and law professor at the University of Pennsylvania Law School
- Francis Bohlen (1868–1942), Algernon Sydney Biddle professor of law at the University of Pennsylvania Law School
- Derek Bok, 25th president of Harvard University—Bryn Mawr
- Adda Burch (1869–1929), teacher-missionary at Concepción College, Concepción, Chile
- Daniel Chamovitz, biologist, author of What a Plant Knows, and president of Ben Gurion University of the Negev
- Harold W. Dodds, 15th president of Princeton University—Utica
- Steven Drizin, lawyer and law professor at the Northwestern University Pritzker School of Law
- Thomas Messinger Drown, fourth president of Lehigh University—Philadelphia
- C. Clement French, sixth president of Washington State University—Philadelphia
- Thomas F. George, chancellor and professor of chemistry and physics, University of Missouri–St. Louis—Philadelphia
- Leonard Hayflick, professor of Anatomy, University of California, San Francisco—Philadelphia
- Susan Henking—Paoli, president of Shimer College
- John W. Heston, second president of Washington State; third president of South Dakota State; fourth president of Dakota State—Bellefonte
- John Heuser, professor of Biophysics, Washington University School of Medicine—Pittsburgh
- John Honnold (1915–2011), law professor at the University of Pennsylvania Law School
- Andrew Knoll, Fisher Professor of Natural History and Professor of Earth and Planetary Sciences, Harvard University—West Reading
- Subodha Kumar, Fox School of Business and Management, Temple University
- Noyes Leech (1921–2010), law professor at the University of Pennsylvania Law School
- Philip Morrison, Institute Professor Emeritus and professor of physics emeritus, Massachusetts Institute of Technology—Pittsburgh
- Julia Anna Orum (1843–1904), principal, Philadelphia School of Elocution
- Christopher Stuart Patterson (1842–1924), dean of the University of Pennsylvania Law School
- Wendell Pritchett, chancellor of Rutgers University–Camden, interim dean and Presidential Professor at the University of Pennsylvania Law School, and Provost of the University of Pennsylvania
- Curtis R. Reitz (born 1929), Algernon Sydney Biddle Professor of Law at the University of Pennsylvania Law School—Reading
- Louis B. Schwartz (1913–2003), law professor at the University of Pennsylvania Law School—Philadelphia
- David Soll, biology professor, University of Iowa—Philadelphia
- Clyde Summers (1918–2010), labor lawyer and law professor at the University of Pennsylvania Law School—Germantown
- Bernard Wolfman (1924–2011), dean of the University of Pennsylvania Law School and law professor—Philadelphia
- John Yoo, professor of Law at the University of California, Berkeley—Philadelphia
- Wendy Cadge, sociologist and president-elect at Bryn Mawr College—Delaware County

== Engineers and inventors ==
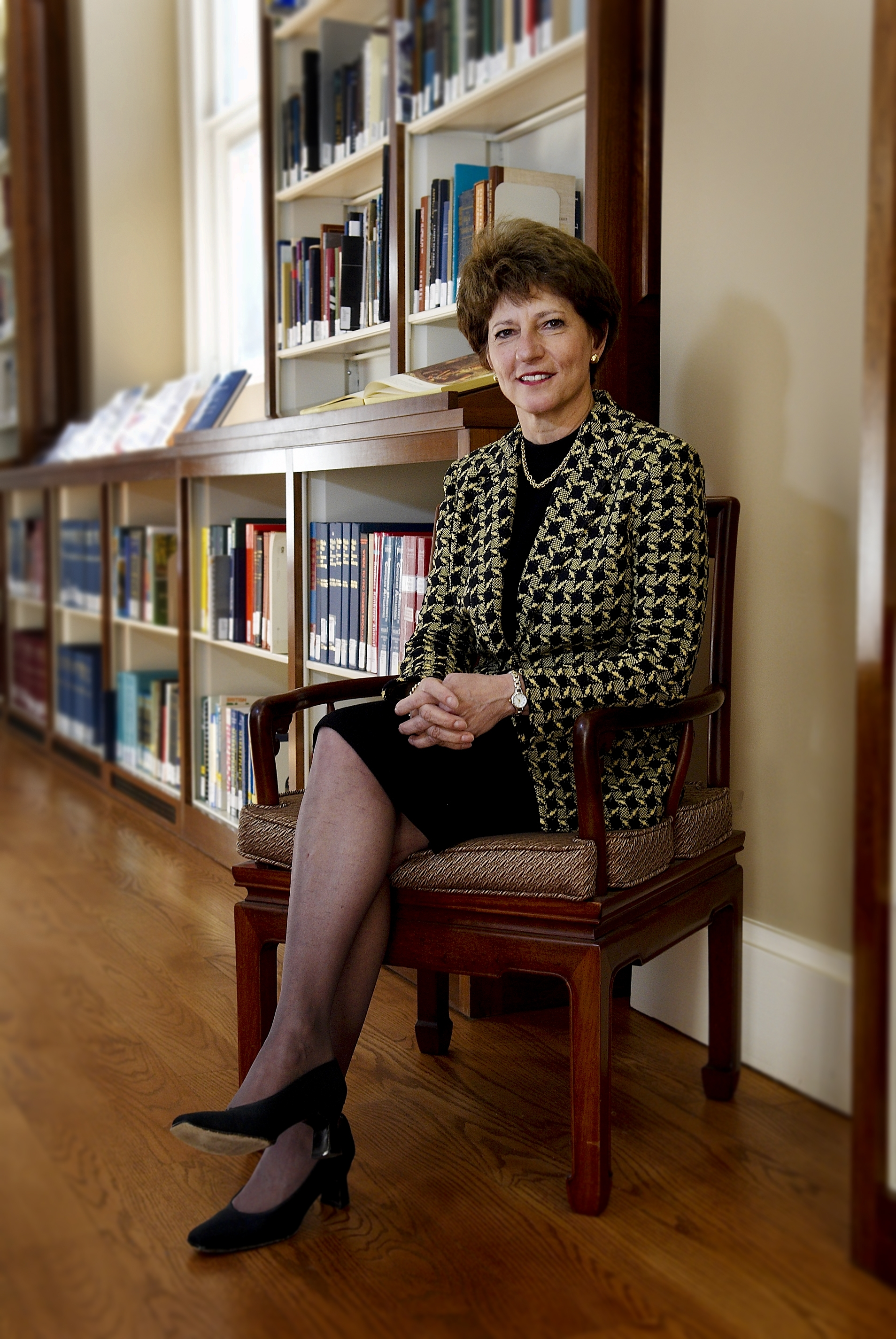
Nance Dicciani

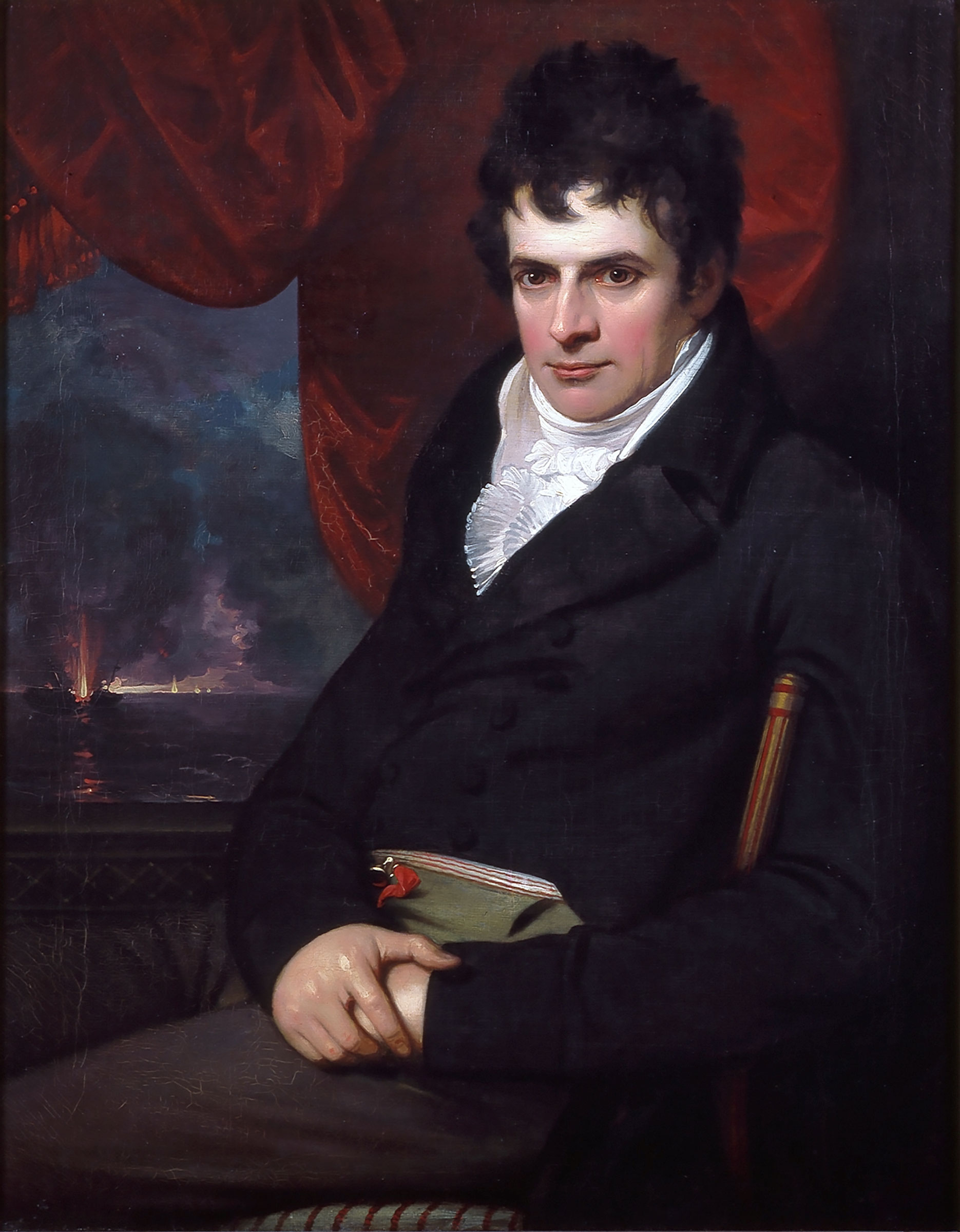
Robert Fulton

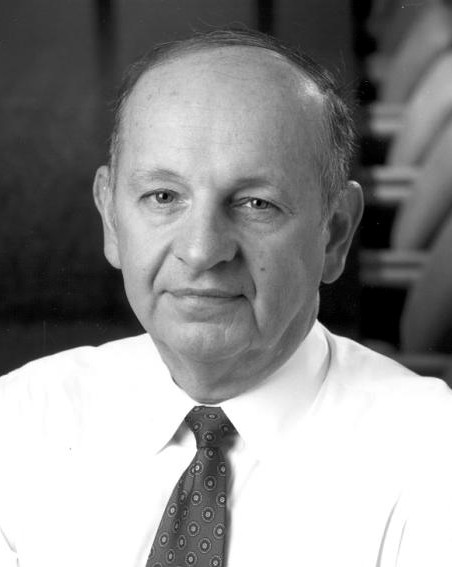
George H. Heilmeier

- James Henry Carpenter—Reading, Berks County
- Edgar Cortright—Hastings
- Sidney Darlington—Pittsburgh
- William C. Davis Jr.—Shinglehouse
- Henry Deringer—Johnstown
- Nance Dicciani—Philadelphia
- J. Presper Eckert—Philadelphia
- Jesse Fell—Wilkes-Barre
- Matthias Forney—Hanover
- Benjamin Franklin—Boston, Massachusetts
- Daniel French—Brownsville and Philadelphia
- Robert Fulton—Little Britain
- Frank Hastings Griffin—Chester
- Mary Hallock-Greenewalt—Philadelphia
- George H. Heilmeier—Philadelphia
- John Kanzius—Washington
- Samuel Kier—Conemaugh Township
- Thomas Midgley Jr.—Beaver Falls
- William C. Pfefferle—Philadelphia
- Alan Pritsker—Philadelphia
- Henry Miller Shreve—Brownsville
- Jacob Snider—Philadelphia
- Frederick Winslow Taylor—Philadelphia
- William Hultz Walker—Pittsburgh
- Nathaniel Wyeth—Chadds Ford

== Entrepreneurs, industrialists, and business executives ==
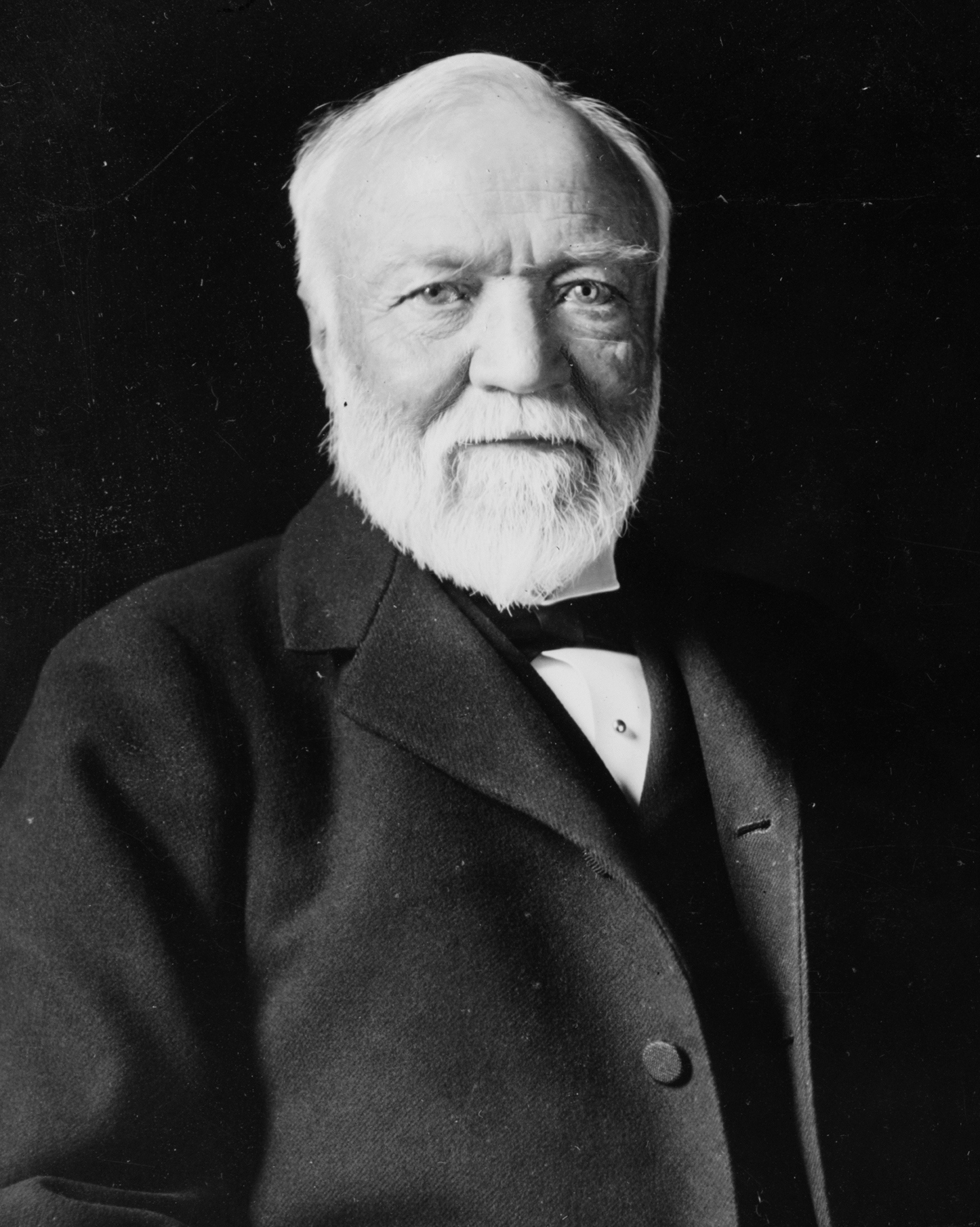
Andrew Carnegie

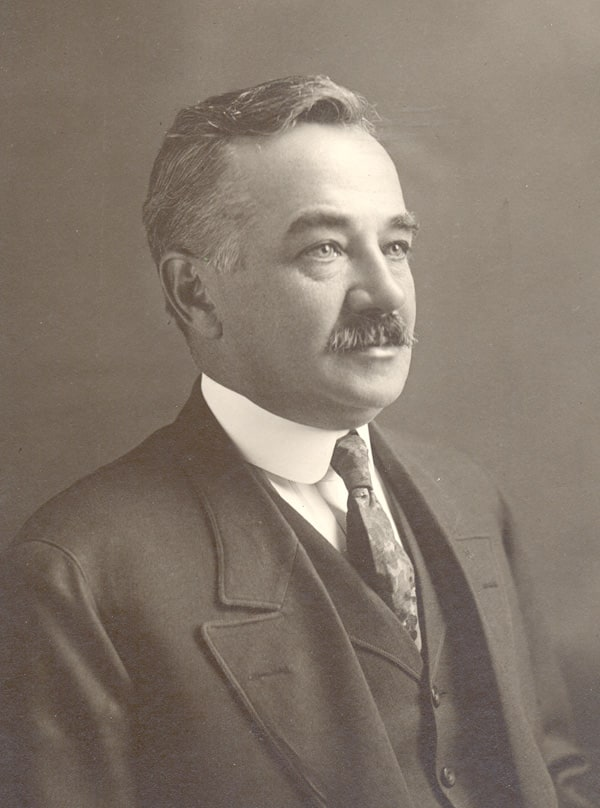
Milton S. Hershey

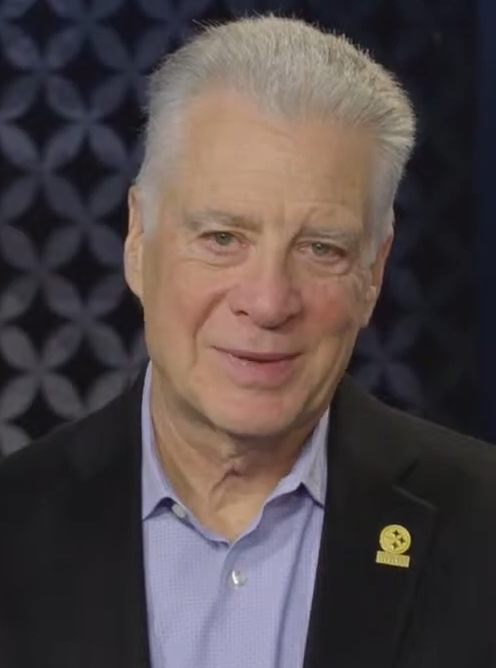
Art Rooney II

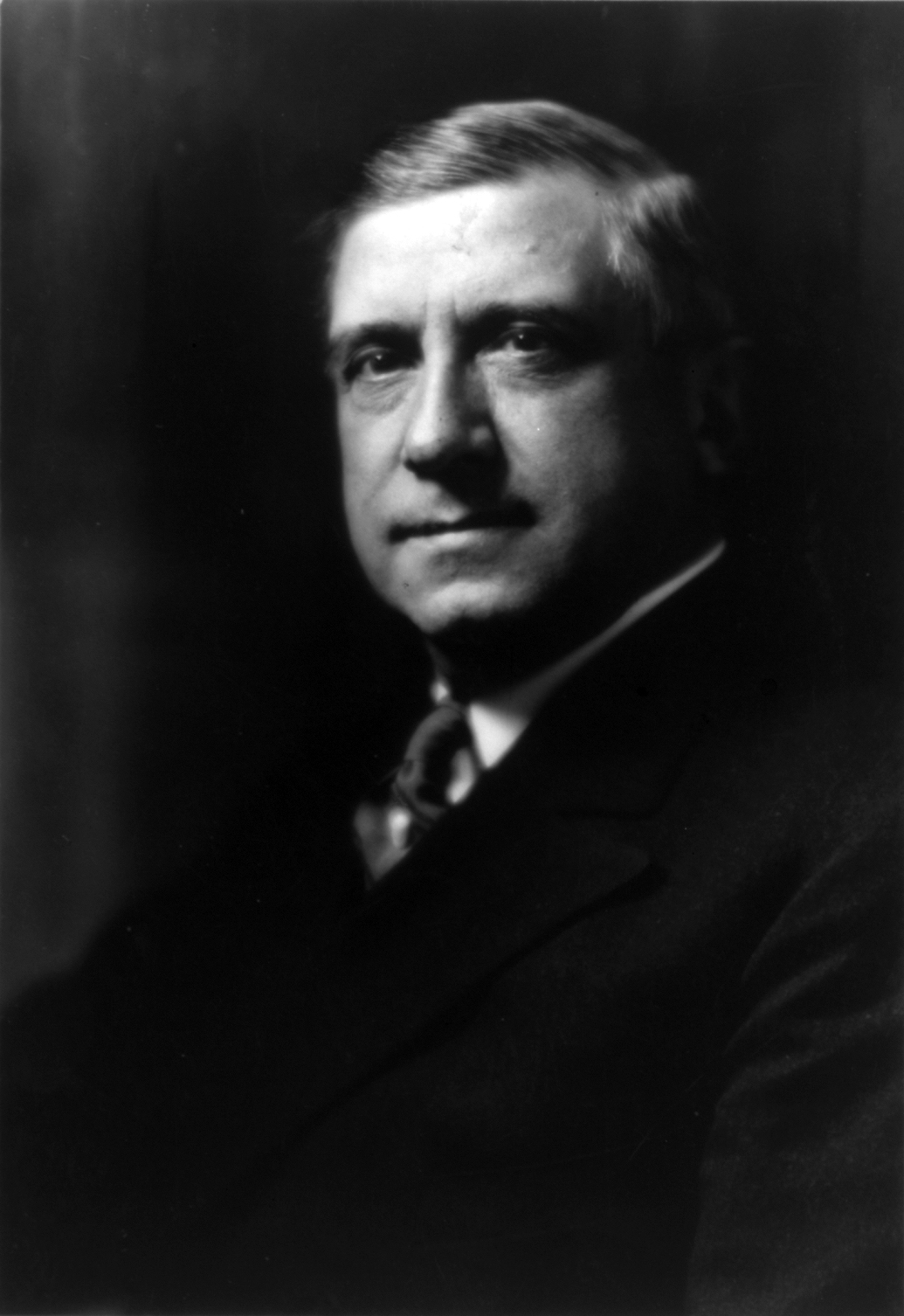
Charles M. Schwab

- John Aglialoro—Philadelphia
- Peter Angelos—Pittsburgh
- James Ford Bell—Philadelphia
- Manoj Bhargava—Philadelphia
- Steve Bisciotti—Philadelphia
- Mary Boone—Erie
- Amar Bose—Philadelphia
- Norman Braman—West Chester / Philadelphia
- Washington Atlee Burpee—Philadelphia
- Andrew Carnegie—Allegheny
- Joan Carter—Pittsburgh
- Kayla Collins—Reading
- James Lindenberg –Pittsburgh
- Henry Pomeroy Davison—Troy
- Mark Donovan—Pittsburgh
- David Edgerton—Lebanon
- Ella M. George—Beaver Falls
- Alex Grass—Scranton
- Clement Griscom—Philadelphia
- Mahlon Haines—York
- Joe Hardy—Pittsburgh
- Maggie Hardy—Pittsburgh
- Richard Hayne—Philadelphia
- Milton S. Hershey—Derry Church (Hershey)
- George Washington Hill—Philadelphia
- Anna Morris Holstein—Muncy
- Alfred Hunt—Bethlehem, Brownsville and Philadelphia
- Lee Iacocca—Allentown
- Bennett S. LeBow—Philadelphia
- Larry Lucchino—Pittsburgh
- David Montgomery—Philadelphia
- Robert Nardelli—Old Forge
- Amedeo Obici—Wilkes-Barre
- Asa Packer—Jim Thorpe (originally called Mauch Chunk)
- H.B. Reese—Derry Church (Hershey)
- Frank Resnik—Unity Township
- Brian Roberts—Philadelphia
- Art Rooney—Coulterville
- Art Rooney II—Pittsburgh
- Richard Mellon Scaife—Pittsburgh
- Charles M. Schwab—Williamsburg / Loretto
- James Sinegal—Pittsburgh
- Jeffrey Skilling—Pittsburgh
- Jim Stamatis—Lehigh Valley
- Charles Strine—Philadelphia
- John Surma—Pittsburgh
- David Tepper—Pittsburgh
- Thomas Usher—Reading
- Jerry Wolman—Shenandoah
- Joseph Wharton—Philadelphia
- Isaiah Vansant Williamson—Bensalem Township
- Samuel Van Leer—Reading

== Film directors, producers, and screenwriters ==
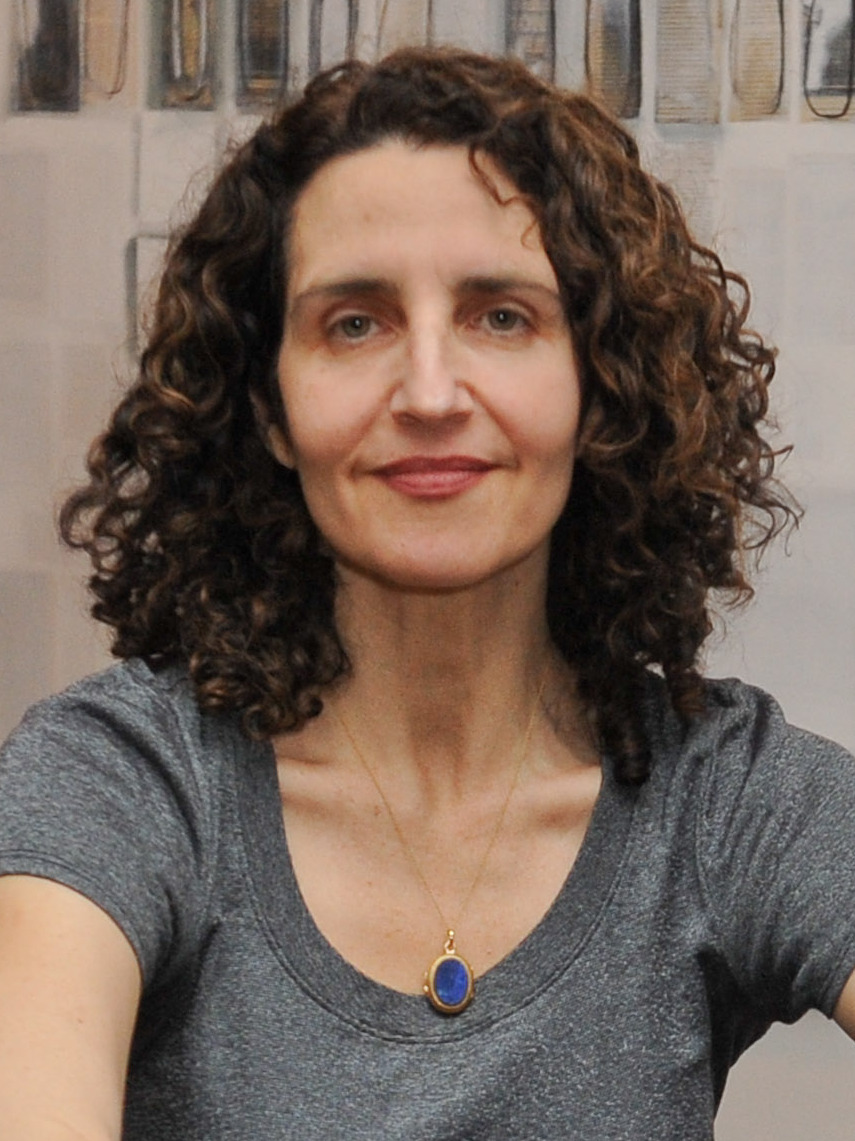
Tamara Jenkins

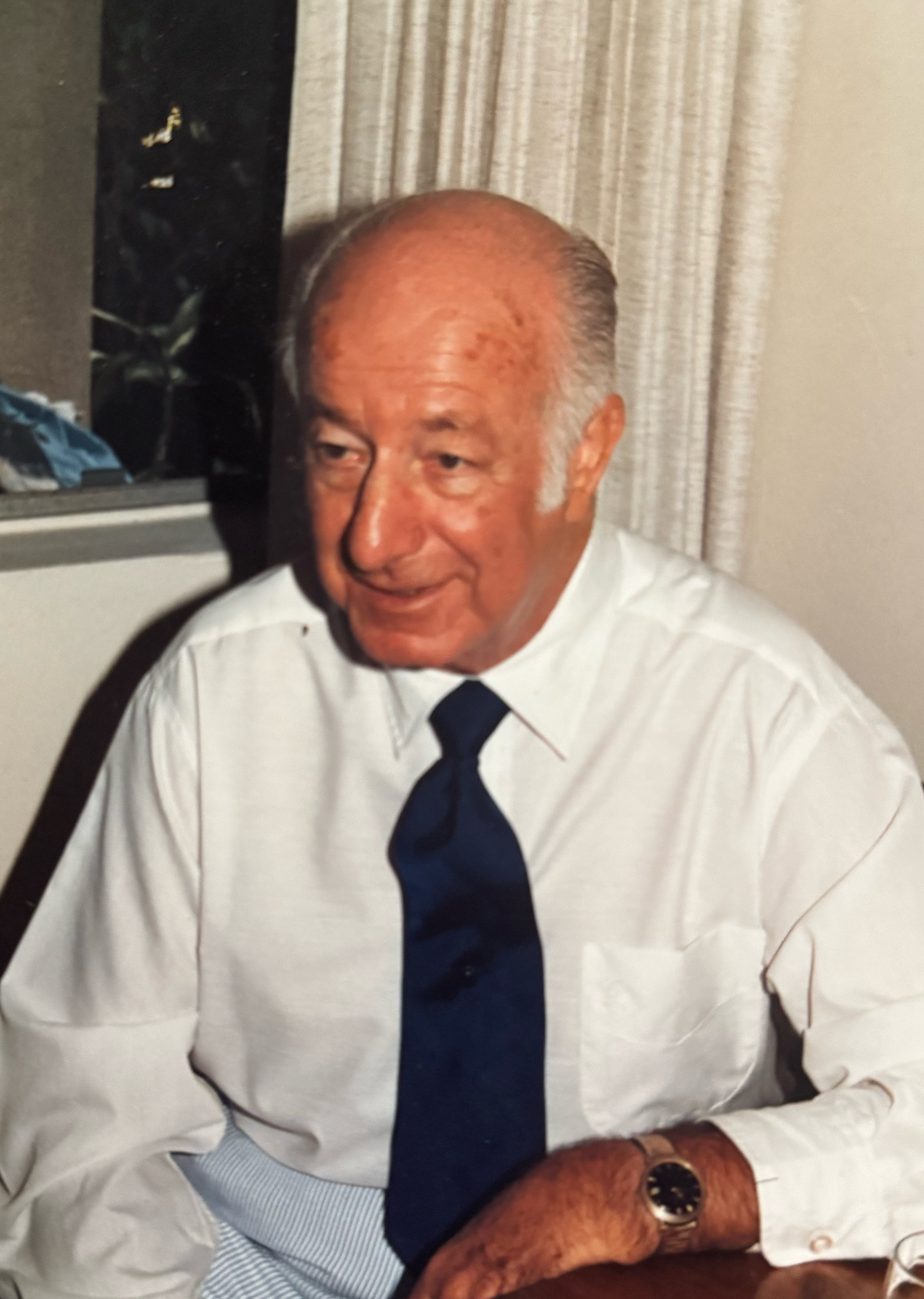
Harold F. Kress

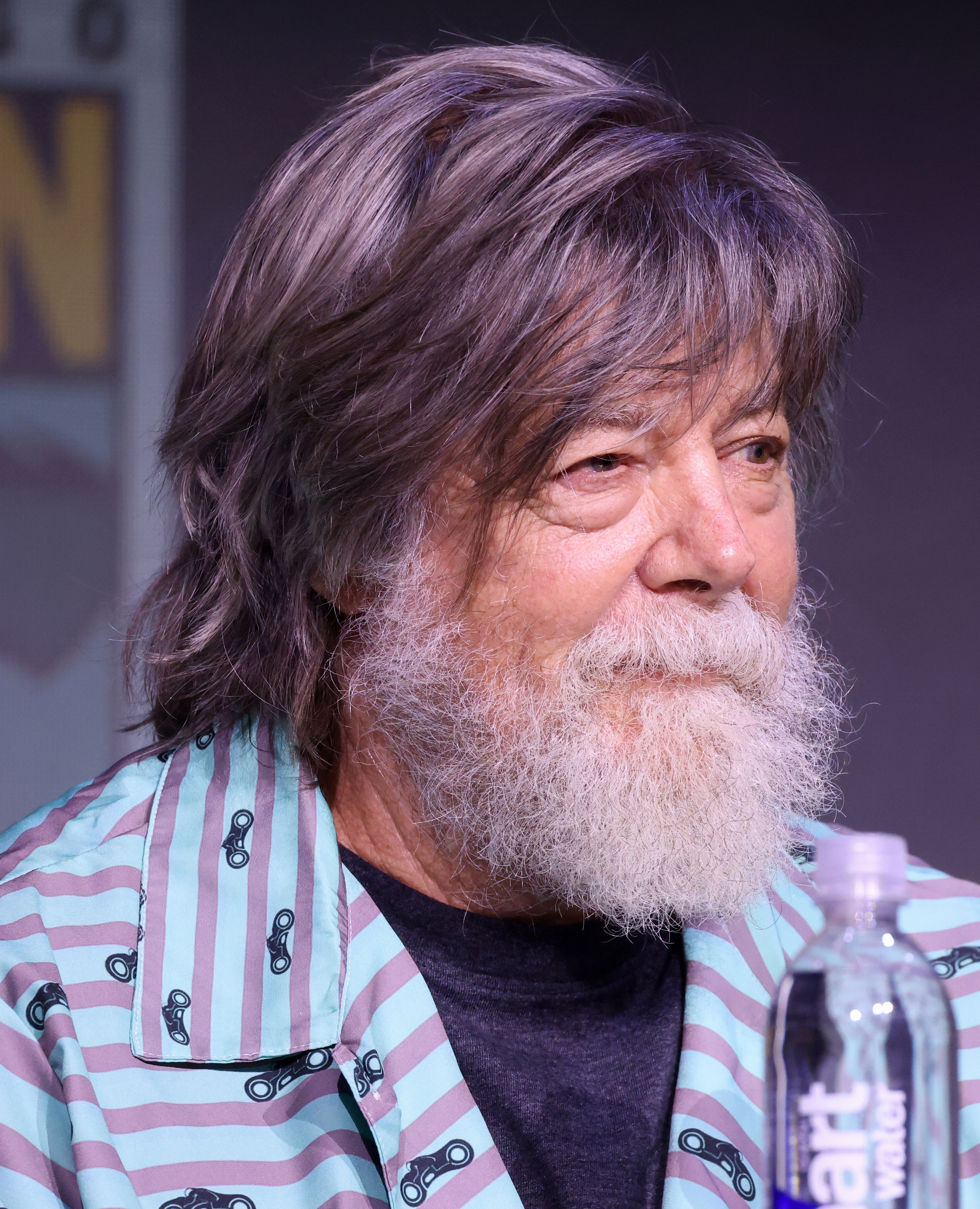
Steven Lisberger

- M. K. Asante—Philadelphia
- Joe Augustyn—Philadelphia
- Donald P. Bellisario—Cokeburg
- Shane Black—Pittsburgh
- Richard Brooks—Philadelphia
- Chris Columbus—Spangler
- Rusty Cundieff—Pittsburgh
- Lee Daniels—Philadelphia
- Brian De Palma—Philadelphia
- Caleb Deschanel—Philadelphia
- Neal Dodson—York
- David M. Evans—Wilkes-Barre
- Peter Farrelly—Phoenixville
- Jonathan Frakes—Bellefonte
- Antoine Fuqua—Pittsburgh
- Todd Gallagher—Greensburg
- Rowdy Herrington—Pittsburgh
- Marshall Herskovitz—Philadelphia
- Tigre Hill—Philadelphia
- Tamar Simon Hoffs—Johnstown
- Todd Holland—Meadville
- David Hollander—Pittsburgh
- Kevin Hooks—Philadelphia
- David Howard—Philadelphia
- Tamara Jenkins—Philadelphia
- Clark Johnson—Philadelphia
- Deborah Kaplan—Abington
- Irvin Kershner—Philadelphia
- Randal Kleiser—Philadelphia
- Harold F. Kress—Pittsburgh
- Charles Leavitt—Pittsburgh
- Richard Lester—Philadelphia
- Herschell Gordon Lewis—Pittsburgh
- Steven Lisberger—Philadelphia
- Sidney Lumet—Philadelphia
- Abby Mann—Philadelphia / East Pittsburgh
- Kathleen Marshall—Pittsburgh
- Elaine May—Philadelphia
- Melanie Mayron—Philadelphia
- Adam McKay—Malvern
- Nancy Meyers—Philadelphia
- Jason Miller—Scranton
- David Mirkin—Philadelphia
- Clifford Odets—Philadelphia
- Eric Red—Pittsburgh
- James Rolfe—Philadelphia
- Richard Rossi—Pittsburgh
- Alvin Sargent—Philadelphia
- Tom Savini—Pittsburgh
- Edwin Sherin—Harrisburg
- M. Night Shyamalan—Philadelphia
- Jerry Stahl—Pittsburgh
- Joseph Strick—Braddock
- Andrew Kevin Walker—Altoona / Mechanicsburg
- Paul Wendkos—Philadelphia
- Sam Wood—Philadelphia
- Bud Yorkin—Washington

== Musicians ==
A–G | H–M | N–Z

A–G

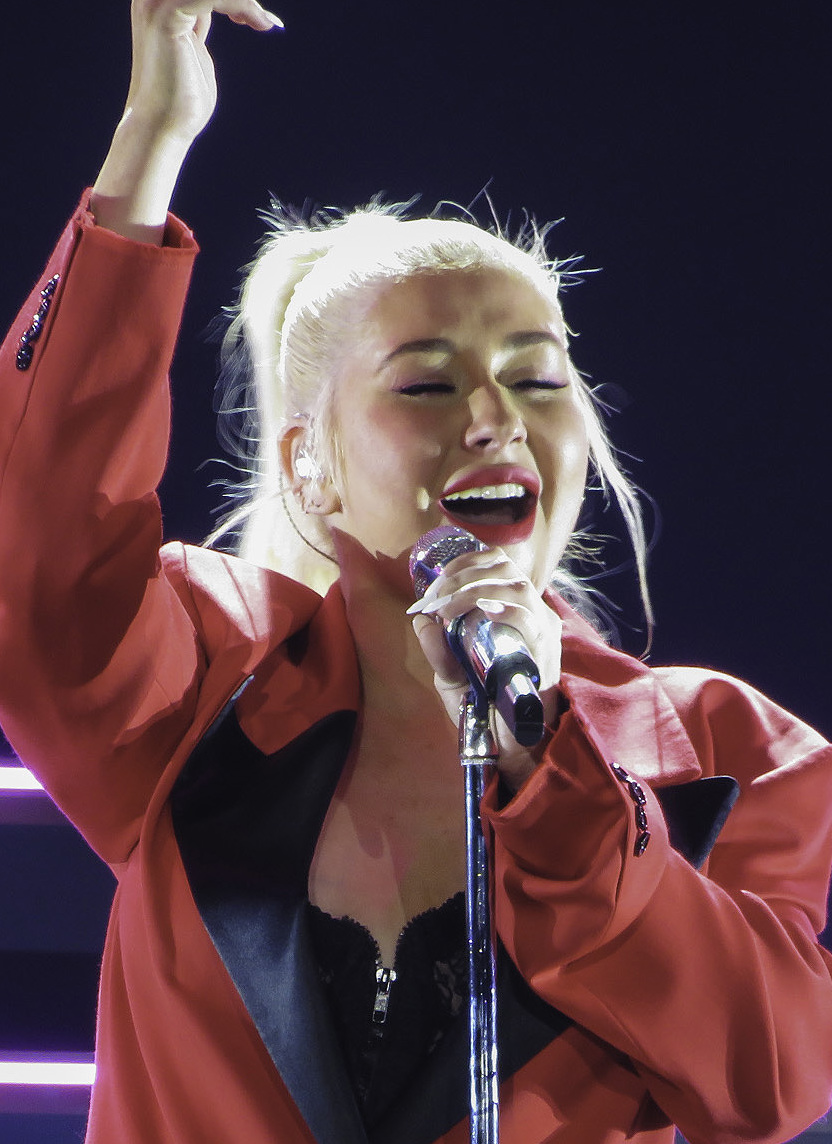
Christina Aguilera

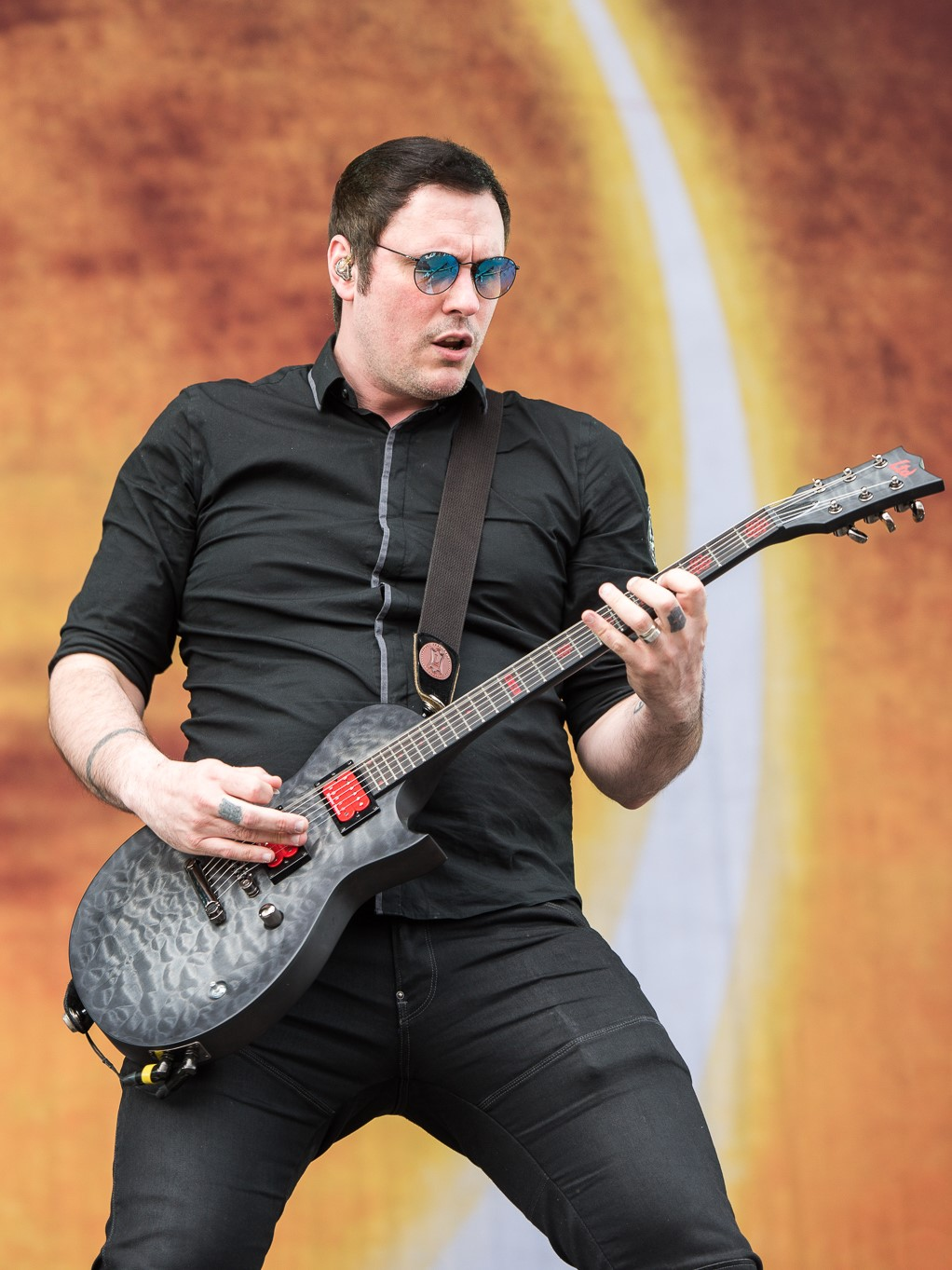
Benjamin Burnley

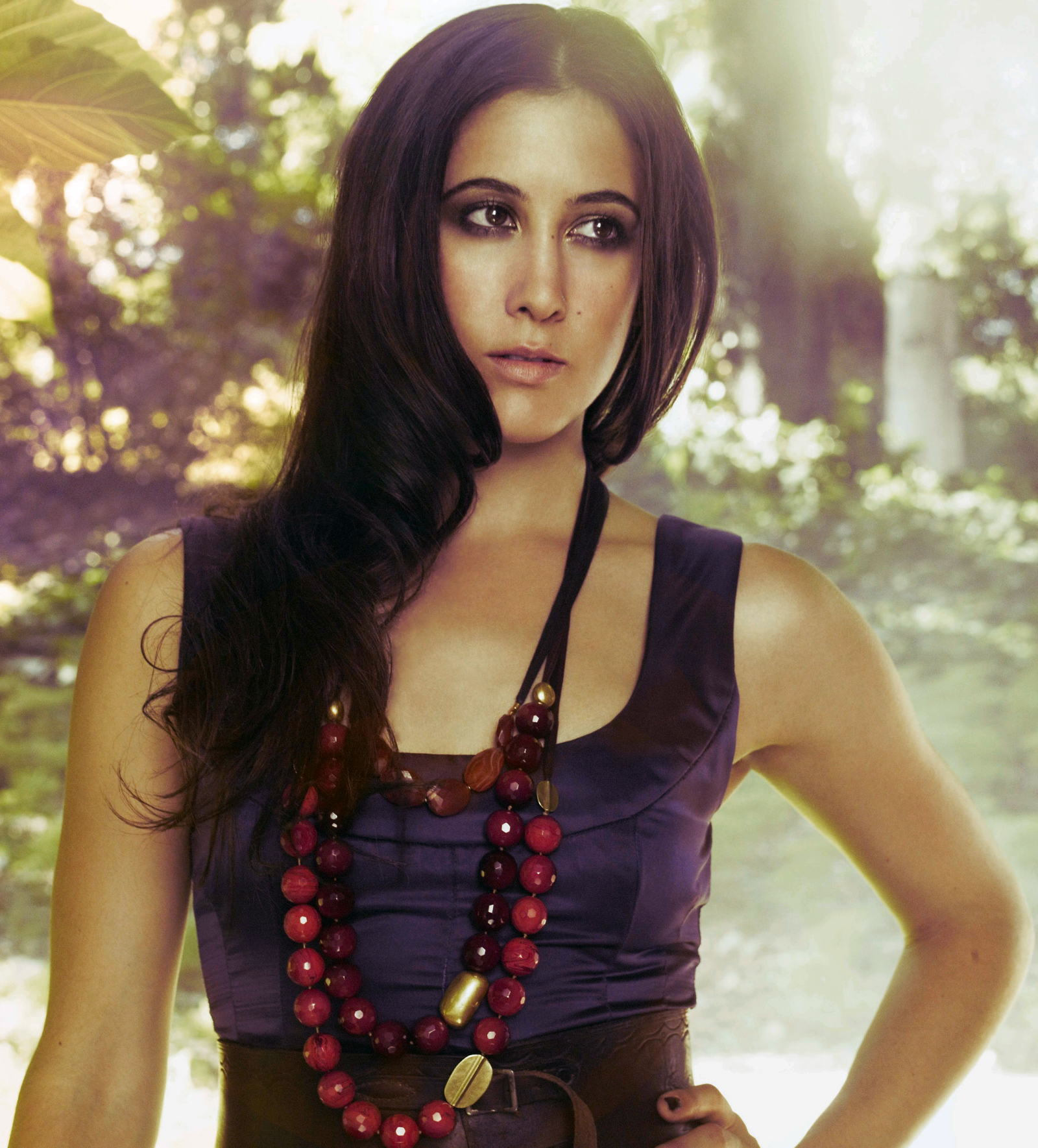
Vanessa Carlton

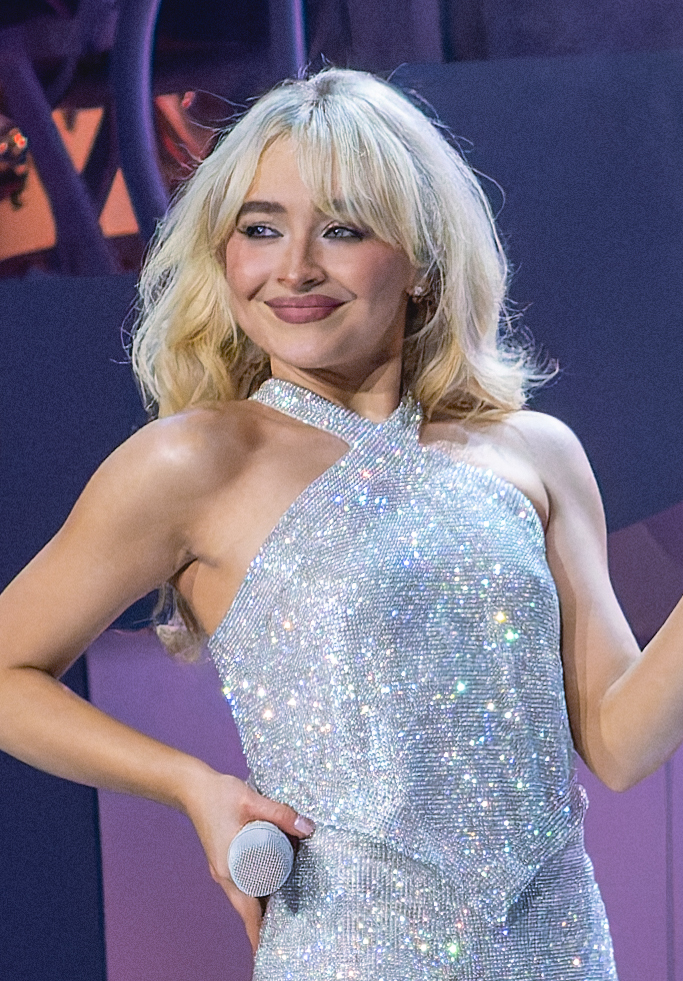
Sabrina Carpenter

- Christina Aguilera—Pittsburgh
- Josh Balz ex keyboardist, Motionless in White
- Marian Anderson—Philadelphia
- Mark Andes—Philadelphia
- Frankie Avalon—Philadelphia
- Samuel Barber—West Chester
- Gabby Barrett—Pittsburgh
- Eric Bazilian—co-founder of The Hooters—Philadelphia
- Franny Beecher—Norristown
- Jeanne Behrend , pianist, musicologist, music educator, and composer—Philadelphia
- George Benson—Pittsburgh
- Les Brown—Lykens
- Jordana Bryant—Bryn Mawr
- Benjamin Burnley—Wilkes-Barre
- Bilal—Philadelphia
- Joe Bonsall—Philadelphia
- Glenn Branca—Harrisburg
- Solomon Burke—Philadelphia
- Vanessa Carlton—Milford
- Sabrina Carpenter—Quakertown
- Cassidy—Philadelphia
- Danny Cedrone—Philadelphia
- Chubby Checker—Philadelphia
- Lou Christie—Moon Township
- Todd Tamanend Clark—Greensboro
- Stanley Clarke—Philadelphia
- Vinnie Colaiuta—Brownsville
- John Coltrane—Philadelphia
- Perry Como—Canonsburg
- Joey Covington—Johnstown
- Crobot (rock band)—Pottsville
- Jim Croce—South Philadelphia
- Patrick Dahlheimer—York
- Bobby Dall—Mechanicsburg
- Lacy J. Dalton—Bloomsburg
- Daya—Pittsburgh
- Jimmy Dorsey—Shenandoah
- Tommy Dorsey—Shenandoah
- Jimmy DeGrasso—Bethlehem
- Esteban—Pittsburgh
- Kevin Eubanks—Philadelphia
- Jackie Evancho—Pittsburgh
- Eve—Philadelphia
- Renée Fleming—Indiana
- Stephen Foster—Pittsburgh
- James Moyer Franks—Trappe
- Freeway—Philadelphia
- James Allen Gähres—Harrisburg
- Joe Genaro—The Dead Milkmen—Wagontown
- Stan Getz—Philadelphia
- Girl Talk -Pittsburgh
- Adam "DJ AM" Goldstein—Philadelphia
- Chad Gracey—York
- Johnny Grande—Philadelphia
- Anthony Green—Doylestown
- Justin Guarini—Doylestown

H–M

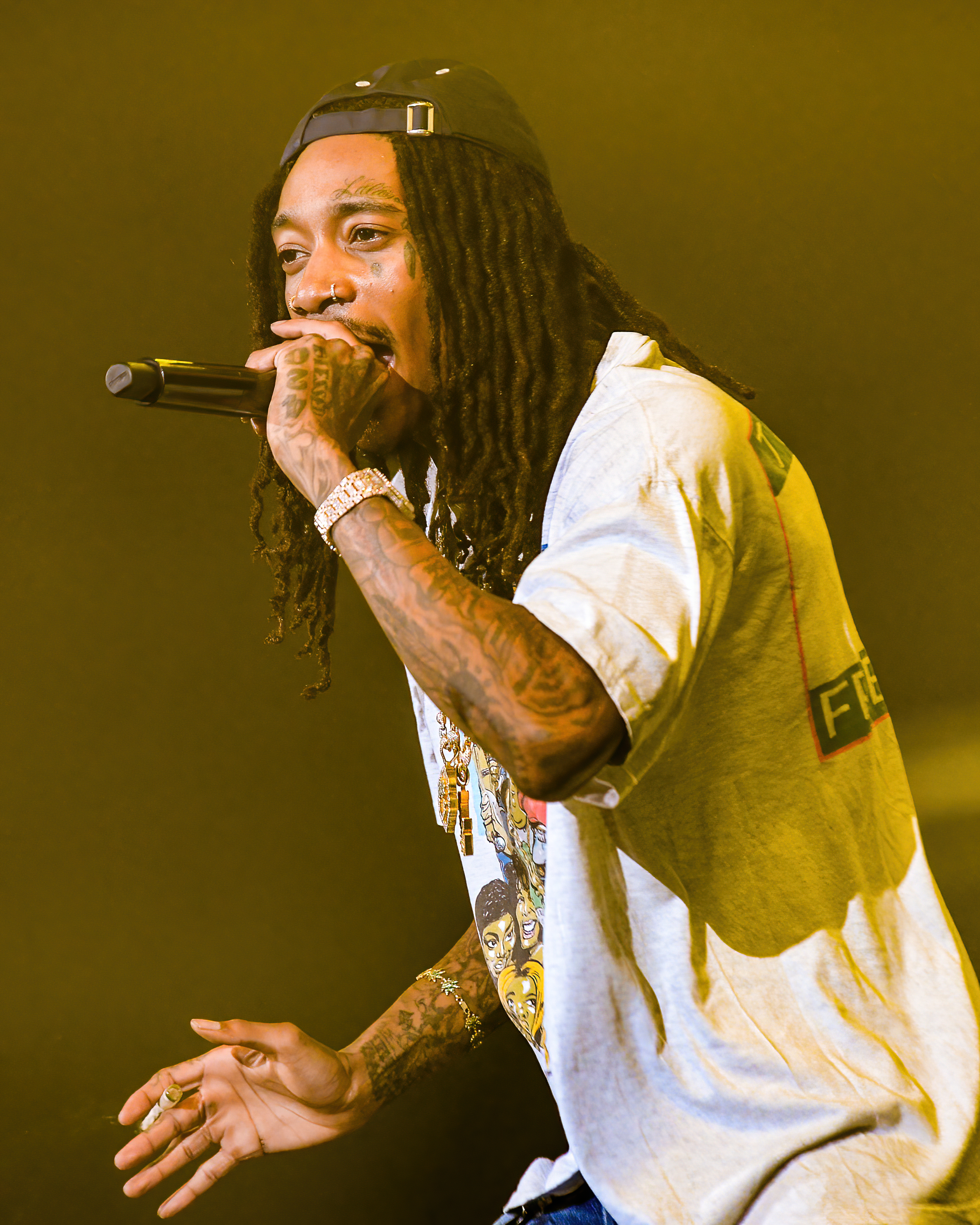
Wiz Khalifa

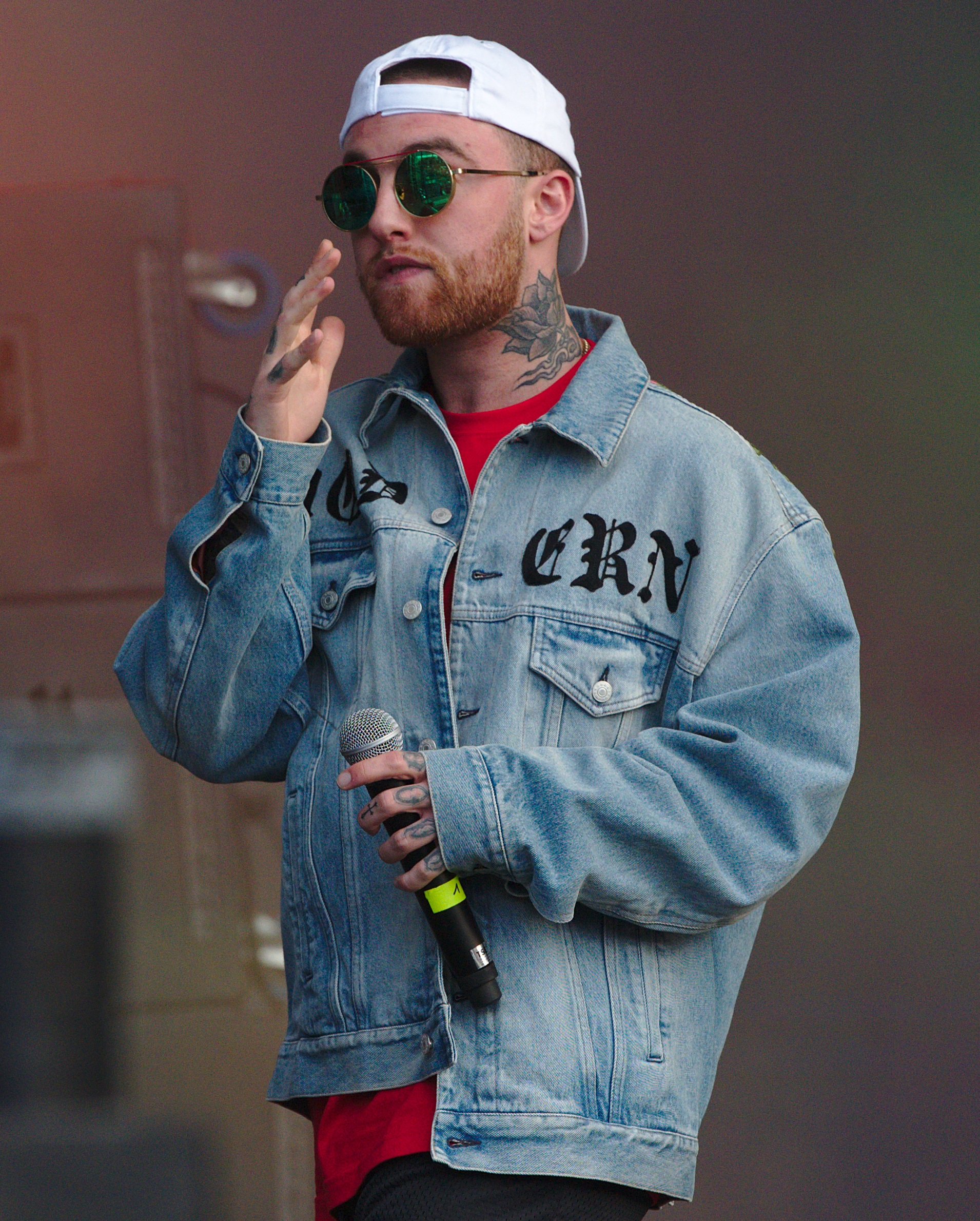
Mac Miller

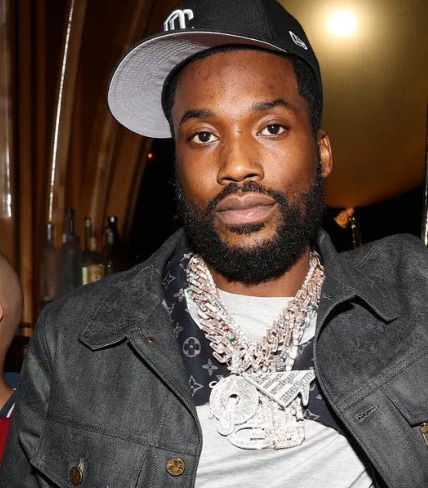
Meek Mill

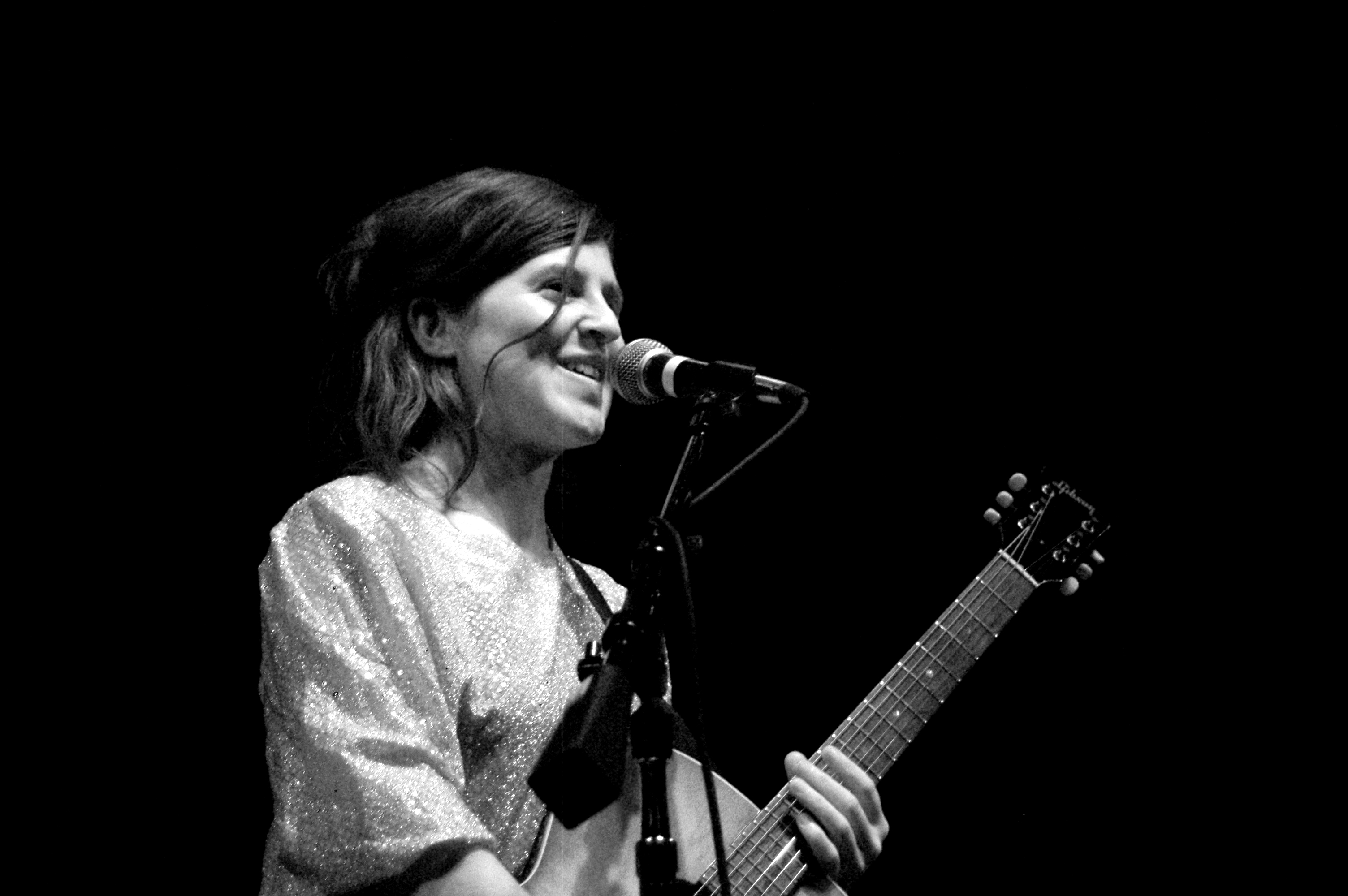
Mirah

- Lzzy Hale—Red Lion
- Daryl Hall—Pottstown
- Mary Hallock-Greenewalt—Philadelphia
- Dan Hartman—Harrisburg
- Phyllis Hyman—Pittsburgh
- Donnie Iris—Ellwood City
- Keith Jarrett—Allentown
- DJ Jazzy Jeff—Philadelphia
- Joan Jett—Philadelphia
- Allan Jones—Old Forge
- Wiz Khalifa—Pittsburgh
- Jason Karaban—Norristown
- Tom Keifer—Springfield
- Chris Kirkpatrick ('N Sync)—Clarion
- Richie Kotzen—Reading
- Ed Kowalczyk—York
- Kurupt—Philadelphia
- Jeff LaBar—Darby
- Patti LaBelle—Philadelphia
- Mario Lanza—Philadelphia
- Rodney Linderman, The Dead Milkmen—Wagontown
- Lil Peep (Gustav Elijah Åhr)—Allentown
- Lil Skies—Waynesboro
- Lil Uzi Vert—Philadelphia
- Lisa Lopes—Philadelphia
- Kellee Maize—Pittsburgh
- Henry Mancini—Aliquippa
- Fred Mascherino—Philadelphia, Coatesville
- Al Martino—Philadelphia
- Pat Martino—Philadelphia
- Billy May—Pittsburgh
- Dan McKeown—Philadelphia
- Meek Mill—Philadelphia
- Mac Miller—Pittsburgh
- Garnet Mimms—Philadelphia
- Bret Michaels—Butler
- Mirah—Philadelphia
- Modern Baseball—Philadelphia Indie Rock Band
- Irene Molloy—Doylestown
- Patrick Monahan—Erie
- Chris Motionless—Scranton
- Musiq Soulchild—Philadelphia

N–Z

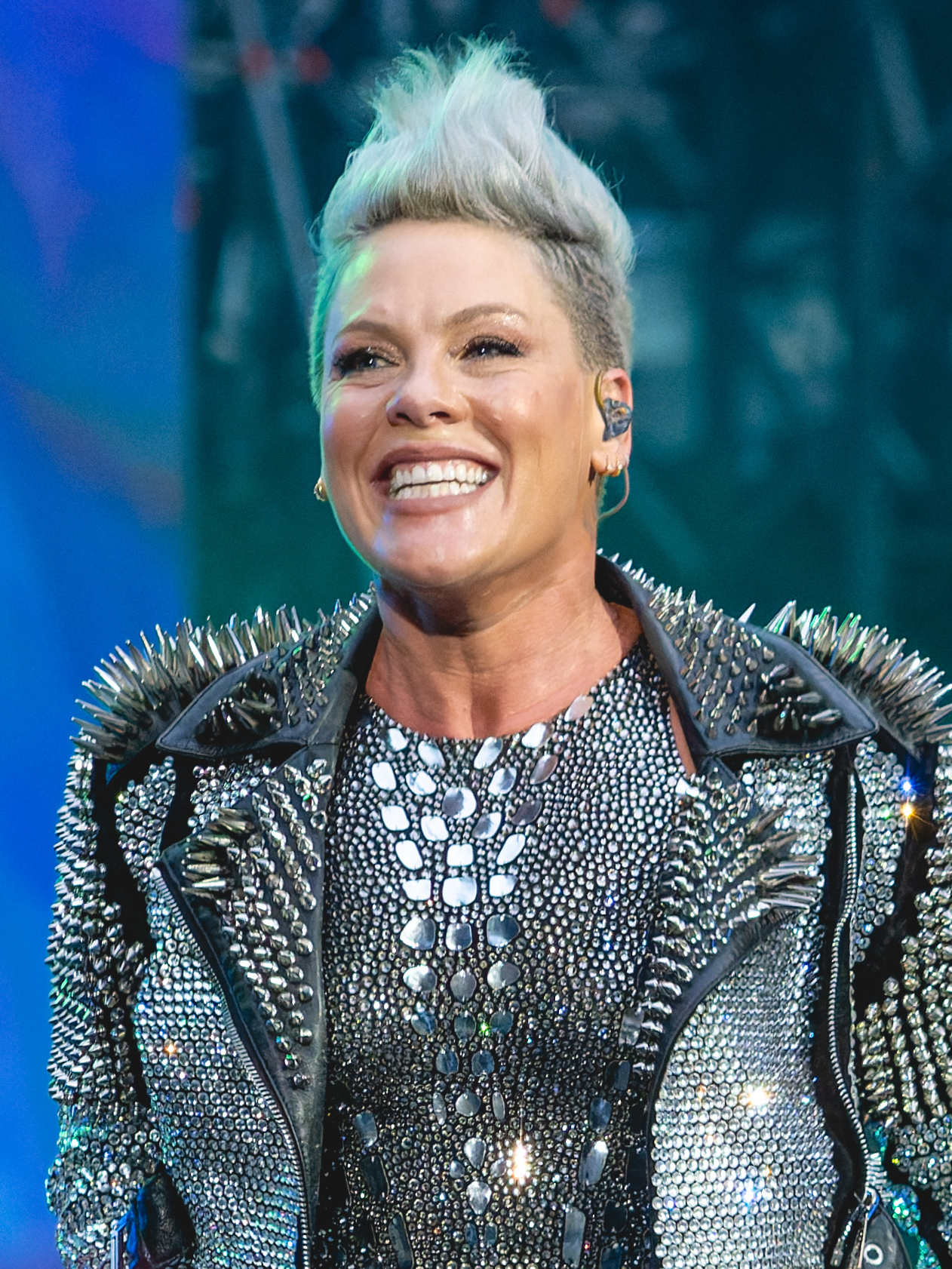
Pink

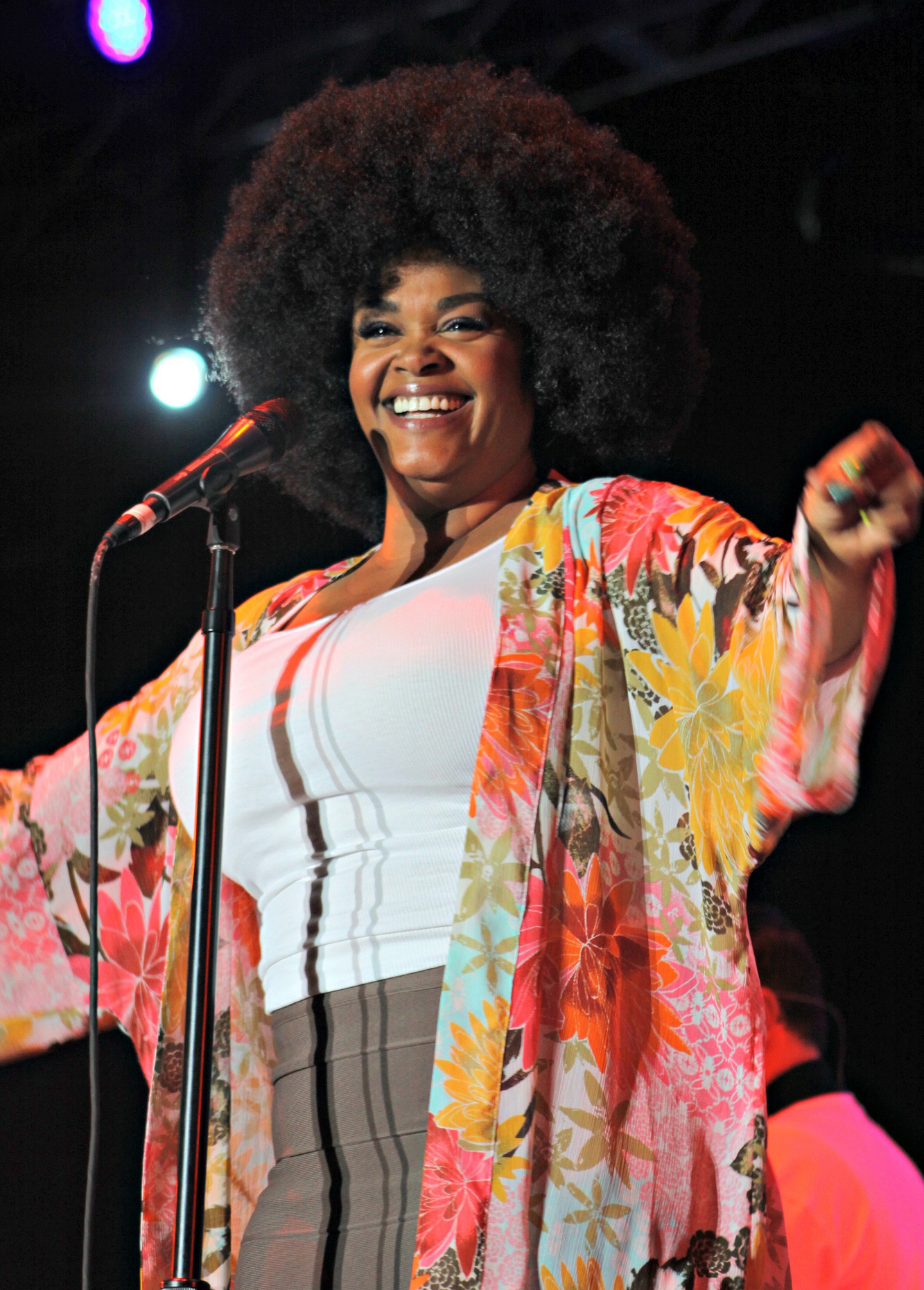
Jill Scott

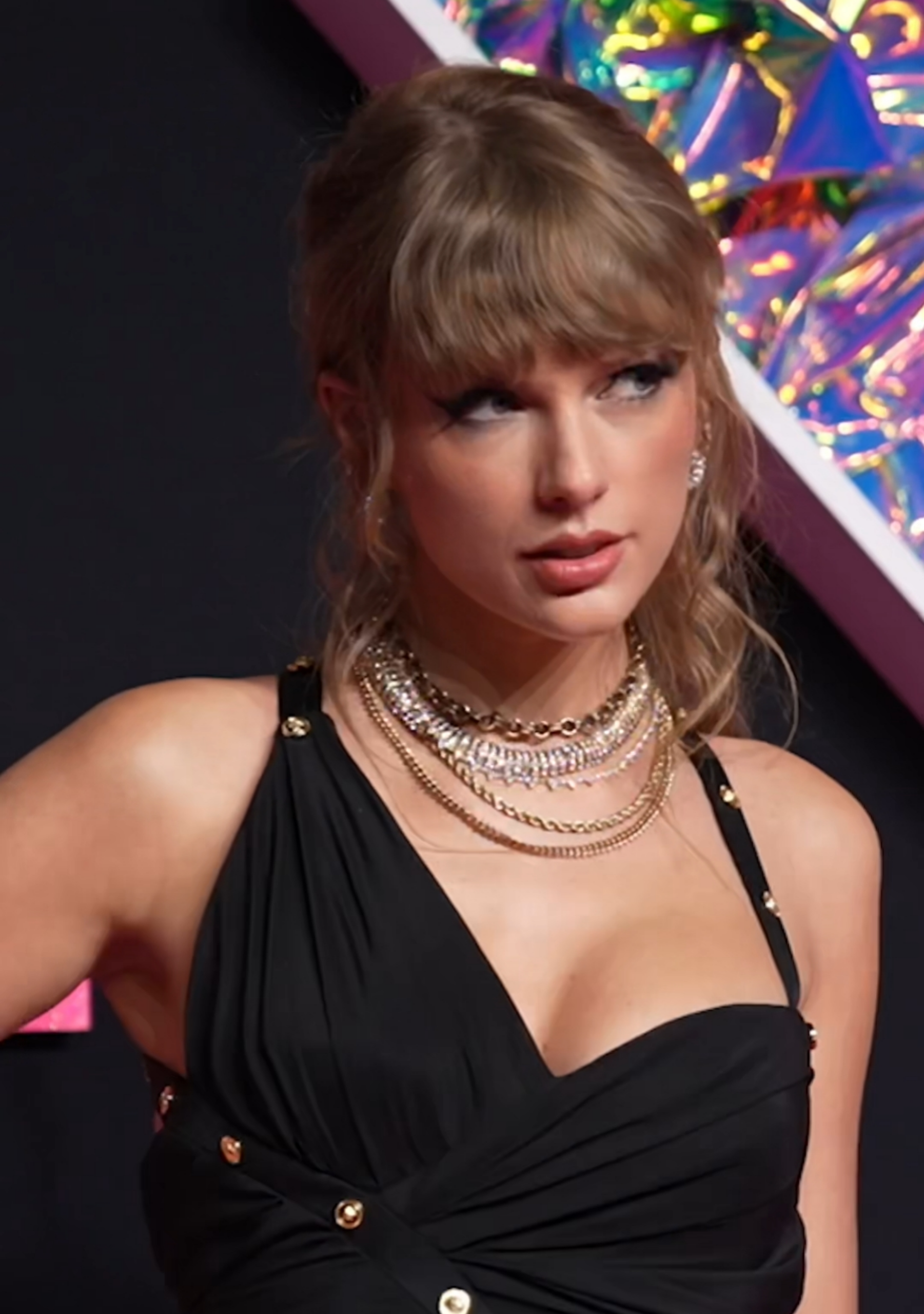
Taylor Swift

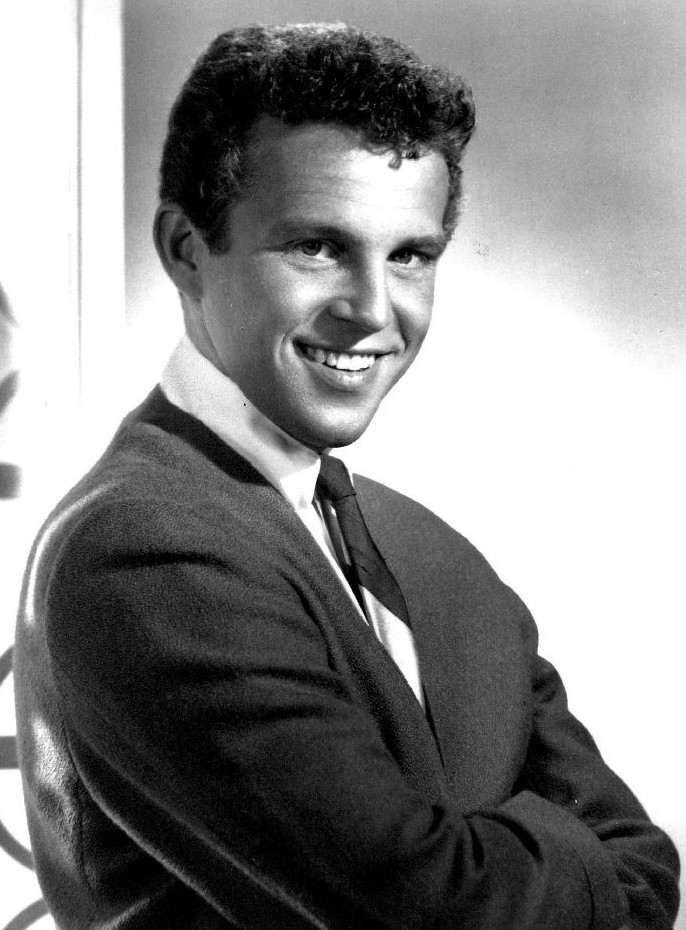
Bobby Vinton

- Jaco Pastorius—Norristown
- Billy Paul—Philadelphia
- Teddy Pendergrass—Philadelphia
- Christina Perri—Bensalem
- Pink—Doylestown
- Jack Pleis—Philadelphia
- Questlove—Philadelphia
- Sun Ra—Philadelphia
- Trent Reznor—Mercer
- PnB Rock—Philadelphia
- Rikki Rockett—Mechanicsburg
- Asher Roth—Morrisville
- Todd Rundgren—Upper Darby
- Bobby Rydell—Philadelphia
- Ira D. Sankey—New Castle
- Santogold—Philadelphia
- Schooly D—Philadelphia
- Jill Scott—Philadelphia
- Shanice—Pittsburgh
- Beanie Sigel—Philadelphia
- Langhorne Slim (Sean Scolnick (Langhorne Slim)—Langhorne
- Will Smith—Philadelphia
- Ivy Sole—Philadelphia
- Jack Stauber—Erie
- Leopold Stokowski—Philadelphia
- Taylor Swift—Reading
- Ted Weems—Pitcairn
- Tammi Terrell—Philadelphia
- Title Fight—Kingston
- McCoy Tyner—Philadelphia
- Bobby Vinton—Canonsburg
- Chris Vrenna—Erie
- John Walker—Johnstown
- Dean Ween—New Hope
- Gene Ween—Philadelphia
- M. E. Willson—Penfield
- Denison Witmer—Lancaster
- Michael J. Woodard—Philadelphia
- Syreeta Wright—Pittsburgh

== Natural scientists and physicians ==
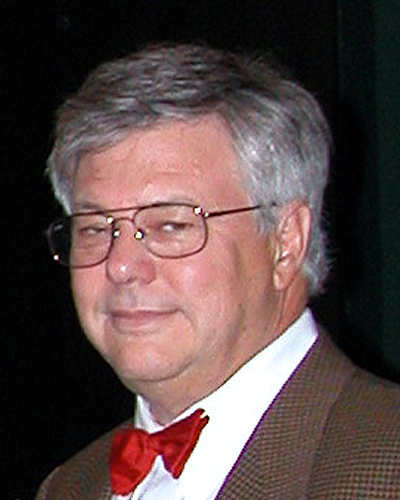
Michael Stuart Brown

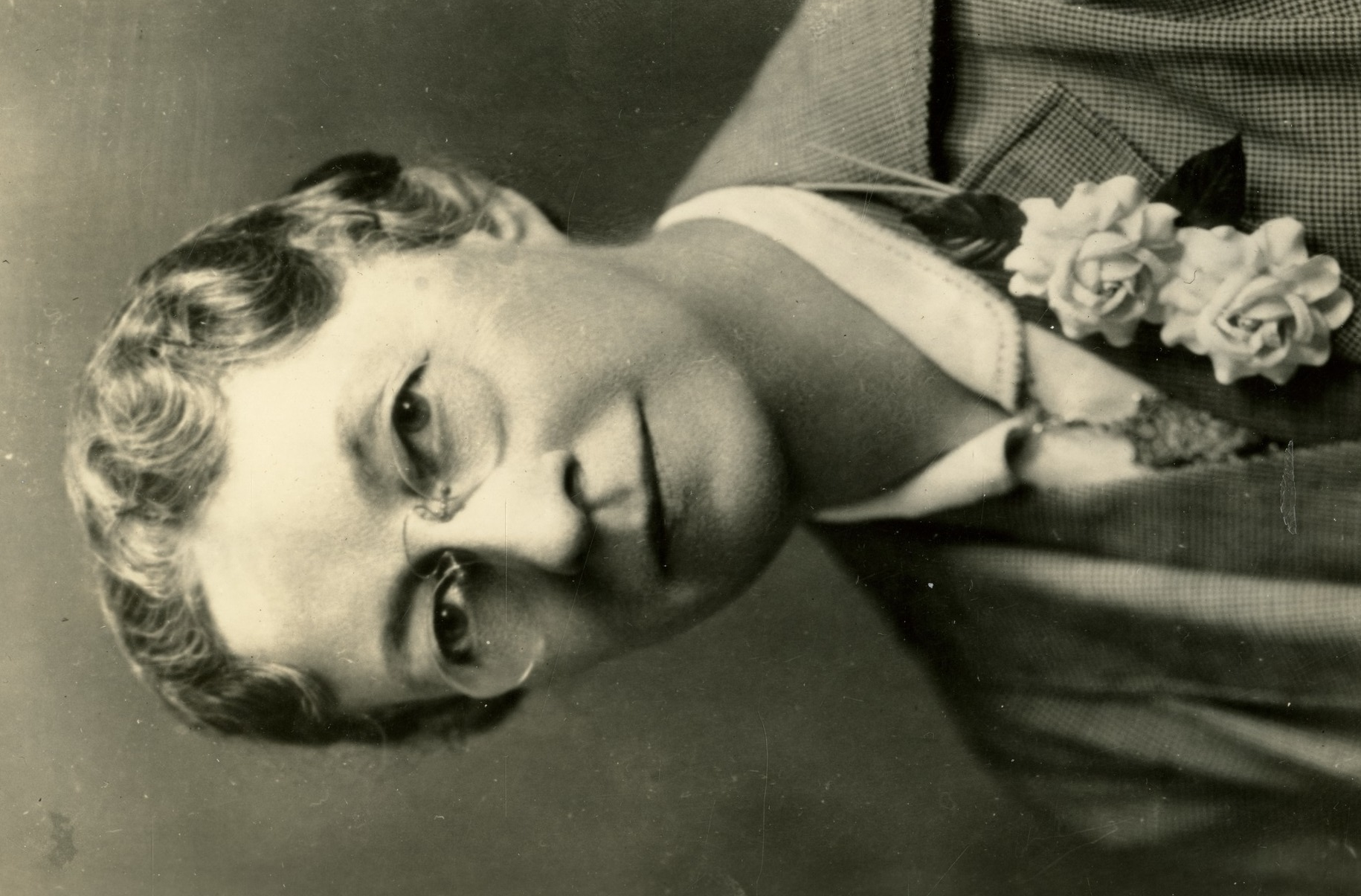
Mary Engle Pennington

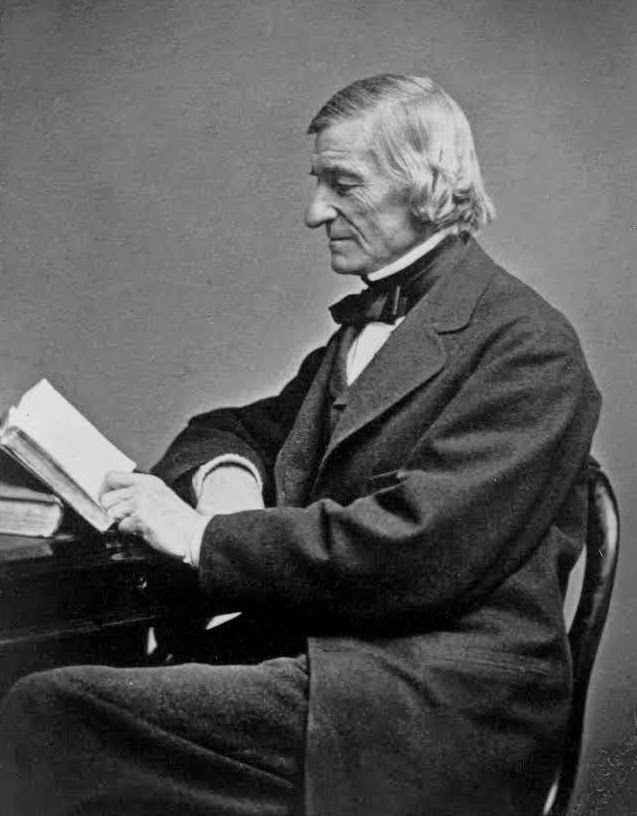
William Barton Rogers

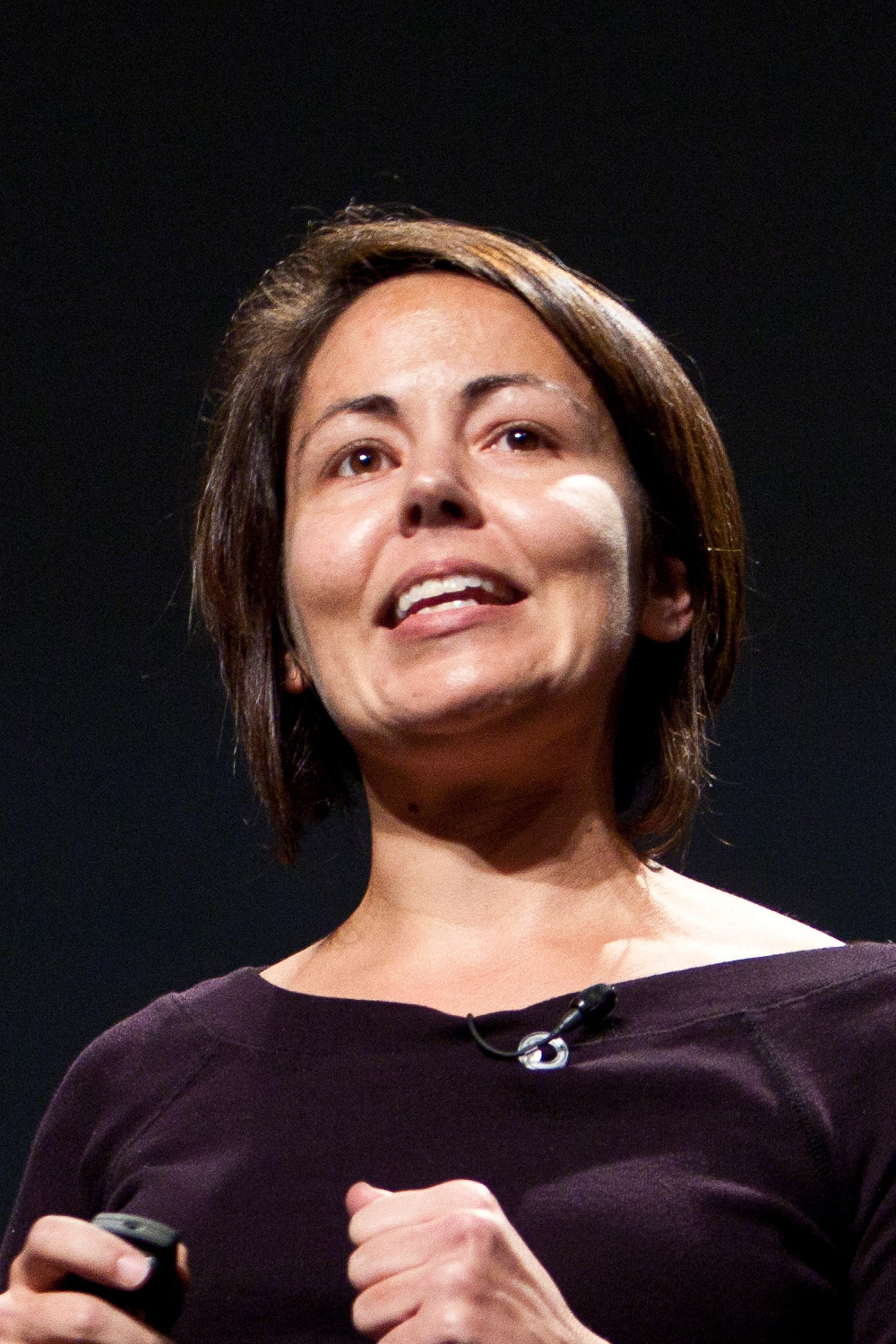
Beth Shapiro

- Edward Acheson—Washington
- Anurag Agrawal—Allentown
- Christian Anfinsen—Monessen
- Alexander Dallas Bache—Philadelphia
- Albert Barnes—Philadelphia
- Michael Behe—Altoona
- Elmer Bolton—Frankford
- James Bond—Philadelphia
- James Booth—Philadelphia
- Herbert Boyer—Derry
- Robert Breed—Brooklyn Township
- Michael Stuart Brown—Wyncote
- Sean M. Carroll—Philadelphia
- Rachel Carson—Springdale
- Daniel Chamovitz—Aliquippa
- Britton Chance—Wilkes-Barre
- Ralph Cicerone—New Castle
- Edward Cope—Philadelphia
- James F. Crow—Phoenixville
- George Delahunty—Upper Darby
- John Dorrance—Bristol
- Alice Evans—Neath
- John Frazer—Philadelphia
- Frederick Genth—Philadelphia
- Frederick Grinnell—Philadelphia
- Robert Hare—Philadelphia
- William Harkins—Titusville
- Philip Hench—Pittsburgh
- Berwind Kaufmann—Philadelphia
- Charles Keeling—Scranton
- John Kopchick—Punxsutawney
- Stephanie Kwolek—New Kensington
- Edward Lewis—Wilkes-Barre
- Stephen Lippard—Pittsburgh
- William Madia—Wilkinsburg
- Daniel Mazia—Scranton
- Samuel George Morton—Philadelphia
- Jack Myers—Damascus Township
- Charles Overberger—Barnesboro
- Mary Pennington—Philadelphia
- Anna M. Longshore Potts–Attleboro (now Langhorne)
- George Prendergast—Philadelphia
- John Quackenbush—Kingston
- David L. Reich—Philadelphia
- Theodore Richards—Germantown
- Charles Rick—Reading
- Anita Roberts—Pittsburgh
- James Rogers—Philadelphia
- William Rogers—Philadelphia
- Henry Augustus Rowland—Honesdale
- Beth Shapiro—Allentown
- Alex Shigo—Duquesne
- Lester Shubin—Philadelphia
- Neil Shubin—Philadelphia
- Daniel Simberloff—Wilson
- Edgar Smith—York
- Howard Temin—Philadelphia
- Claude Alvin Villee Jr.—Lancaster
- Bernardhus Van Leer (1687–1790), one of the first doctors in New York
- William Walker—Pittsburgh
- Michael Welner—Pittsburgh
- Caspar Wistar—Philadelphia
- Rake Yohn—West Chester
- Roger Young—Burgettstown

== Politics, government, and military ==
A–M | N–Z

A–M

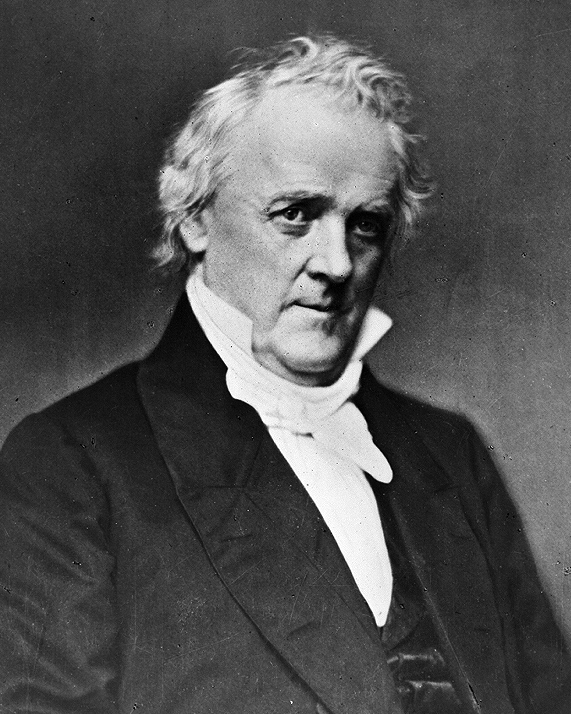
James Buchanan

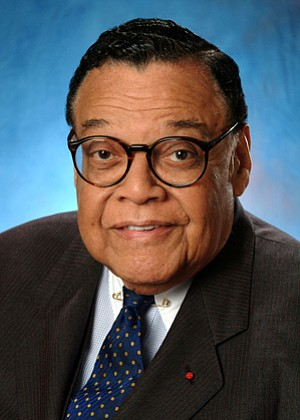
William Thaddeus Coleman Jr.

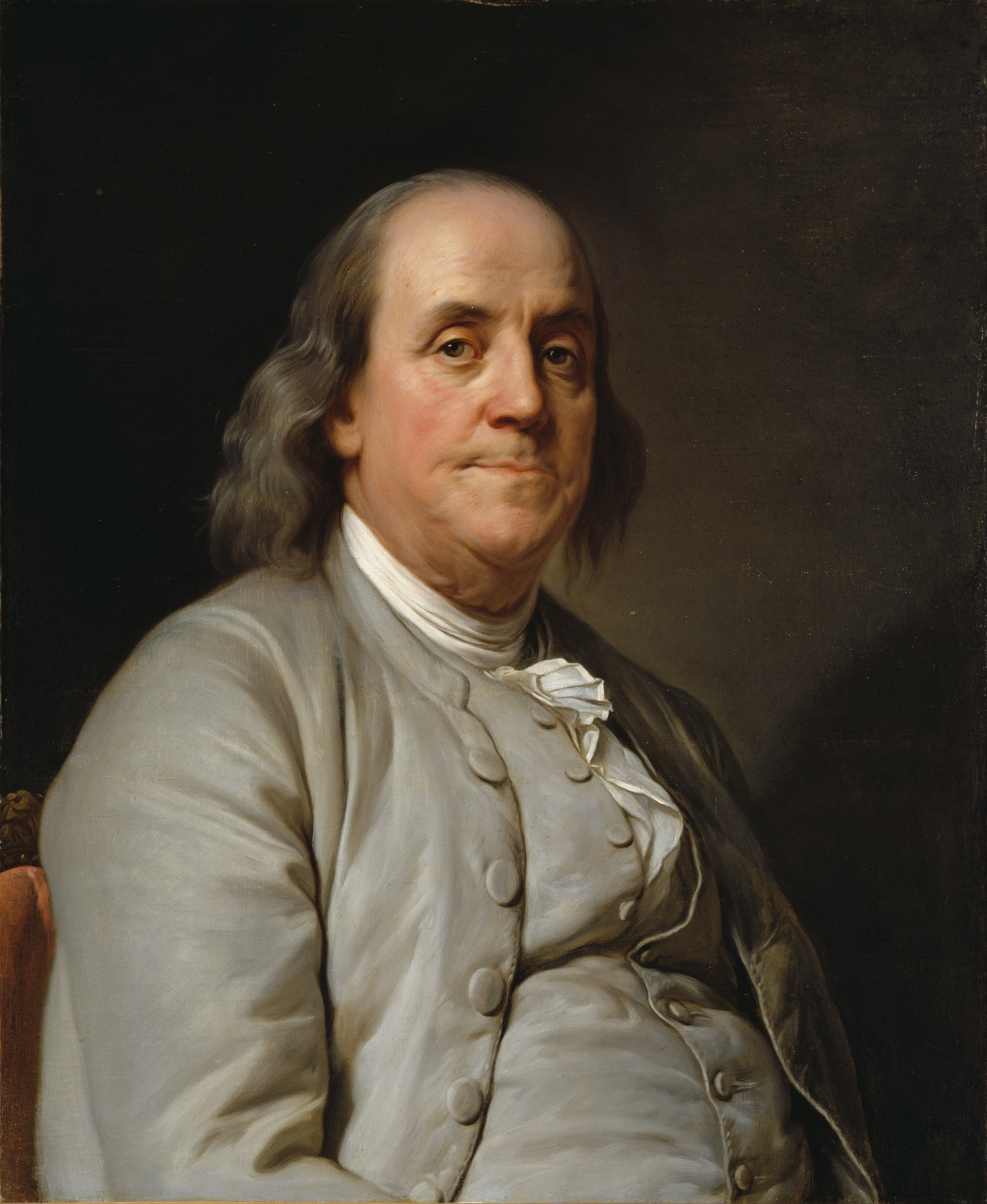
Benjamin Franklin

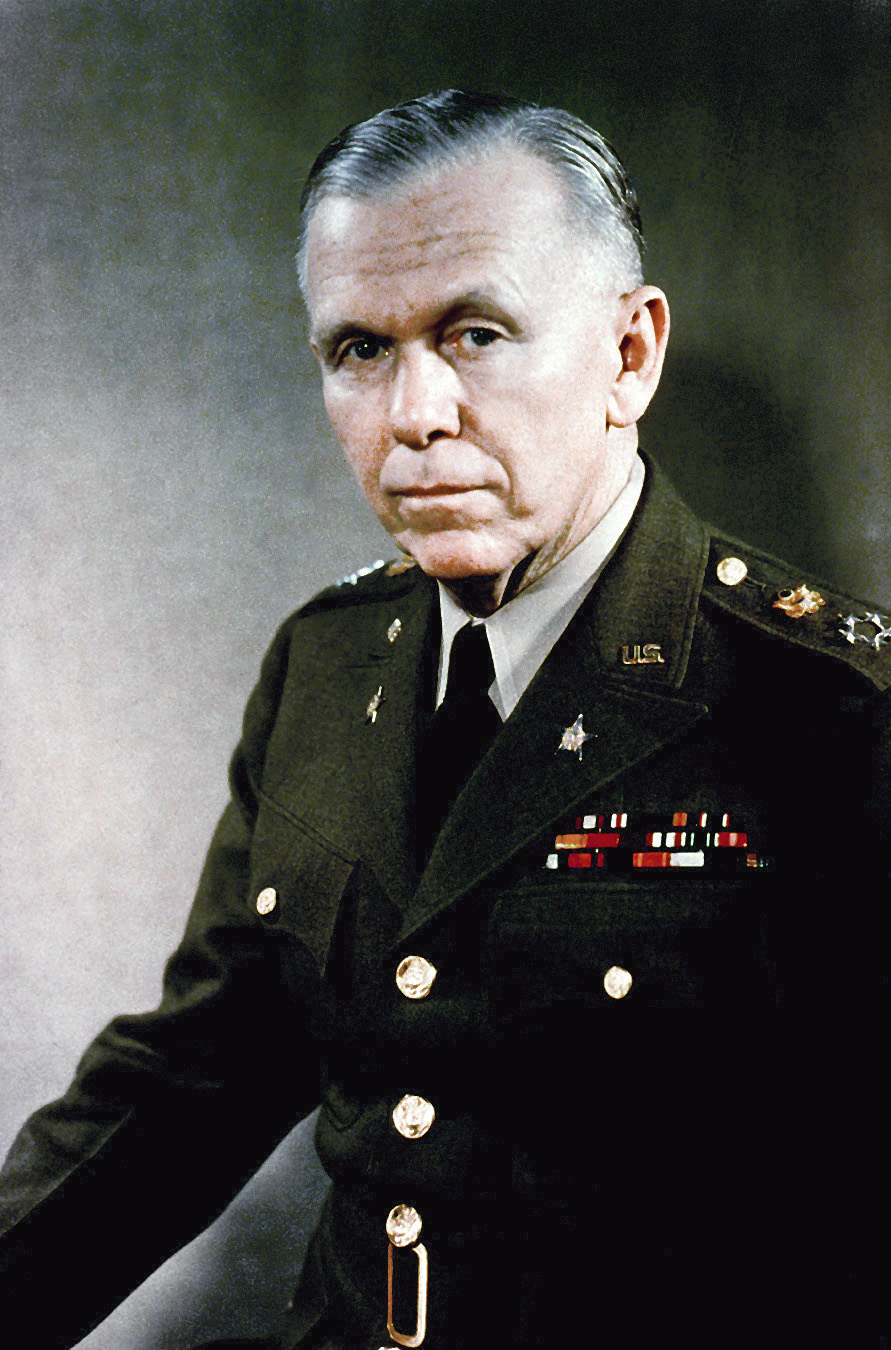
George C. Marshall

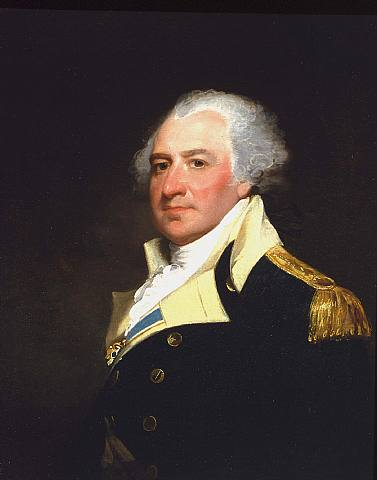
Thomas Mifflin

- Claude Allen, assistant to the president for domestic policy under George W. Bush—Philadelphia
- Jason Altmire, author and U.S. representative—Lower Burrell
- Henry "Hap" Arnold, U.S. Army and U.S. Air Force general—Gladwyne
- John C. Bell Jr., 33rd governor of Pennsylvania—Philadelphia
- Joe Biden, 46th president of the United States (2021–2025), 47th vice president of the United States (2009–2017), longtime U.S. senator from Delaware (1973–2009)—Scranton
- Robert Bork, solicitor general, attorney general, judge of the D.C. Circuit Court of Appeals, Supreme Court nominee—Pittsburgh
- John Boyd, USAF fighter pilot and Pentagon consultant, developer of the OODA loop—Erie
- Martin Grove Brumbaugh, 26th governor of Pennsylvania—Huntingdon County
- James Buchanan, 15th president of the United States—Cove Gap
- Smedley Butler, U.S. Marine Corps general—West Chester
- Frank Carlucci, U.S. secretary of defense under Ronald Reagan—Scranton
- Samuel Carpenter, first treasurer 1704, deputy governor to William Penn—Philadelphia
- Ashton Carter, U.S. secretary of defense under Barack Obama—Philadelphia
- Bob Casey Jr., US senator, son of former governor—Scranton
- Robert P. Casey, 42nd governor of Pennsylvania—Scranton
- Frank Cassidy, former U.S. Federal Housing Commissioner and Assistant Secretary for Housing—Montgomery County
- Benjamin Chew, chief justice of Supreme Court of Pennsylvania, state attorney general—Philadelphia
- Joseph Clancy, director of Secret Service under Barack Obama—Philadelphia
- Mark B. Cohen, Democratic chairman, Human Services Committee, Pennsylvania House of Representatives
- William Coleman, U.S. Secretary of Transportation under Gerald Ford—Philadelphia
- Tom Corbett, 46th governor of Pennsylvania—Philadelphia
- George M. Dallas, 11th vice president of the United States—Philadelphia
- James J. Davis, U.S. Secretary of Labor, U.S. Senator—Pittsburgh
- James H. Duff, U.S. senator and 34th governor—Carnegie
- R. Budd Dwyer, treasurer, state senator and representative—Harrisburg
- George Howard Earle III, 30th governor of Pennsylvania—Montgomery County
- Peter Feaver, National Security Council member for Clinton and Bush administrations—Bethlehem
- Bob Filner, mayor of San Diego—Pittsburgh
- John Stuchell Fisher, 29th governor of Pennsylvania—South Mahoning Twp.
- Benjamin Franklin, scientist, diplomat, teacher, and founding father of the United States—Philadelphia
- Frank Gaffney, deputy assistant secretary of Defense under Ronald Reagan—Pittsburgh
- Newt Gingrich, speaker of the U.S. House of Representatives—Harrisburg
- Alexander Haig, secretary of state, White House chief of staff, NATO supreme commander—Philadelphia
- Winfield Scott Hancock, Union Civil War commander—Montgomeryville
- Orrin Hatch, Republican senator from Utah—Pittsburgh
- Michael Hayden, director of CIA under George W. Bush—Pittsburgh
- William G. Hundley, criminal defense attorney—Pittsburgh
- Harold L. Ickes, secretary of interior under Franklin D. Roosevelt—Altoona
- Arthur James, 31st governor of Pennsylvania—Plymouth
- Michael Johns, U.S. presidential speechwriter—Emmaus
- George Joulwan, U.S. Army general—Pottsville
- John Kasich, congressman from Ohio (1983–2001), 69th governor of Ohio, presidential candidate in 2016 and 2000—Pittsburgh
- Donald Kohn, vice chairman of Federal Reserve—Philadelphia
- Alf Landon, governor of Kansas and presidential candidate—West Middlesex
- Andrew Lewis, secretary of transportation under Ronald Reagan—Philadelphia
- Richard Marcinko, Navy Seal, commanded Seal Team Six—Lansford
- George Marshall, secretary of defense under Harry S. Truman—Uniontown
- Edward Martin, U.S. senator and 32nd governor of Pennsylvania—Ten Mile
- Betsy McCaughey, lieutenant governor of New York—Pittsburgh
- John J. McCloy, assistant secretary of war during World War II—Philadelphia
- H. R. McMaster, national security advisor, U.S. Army Lt. General—Philadelphia
- Royal Meeker, advisor to President Woodrow Wilson—Quaker Lake
- Thomas Mifflin, first governor of Pennsylvania—Philadelphia

N–Z

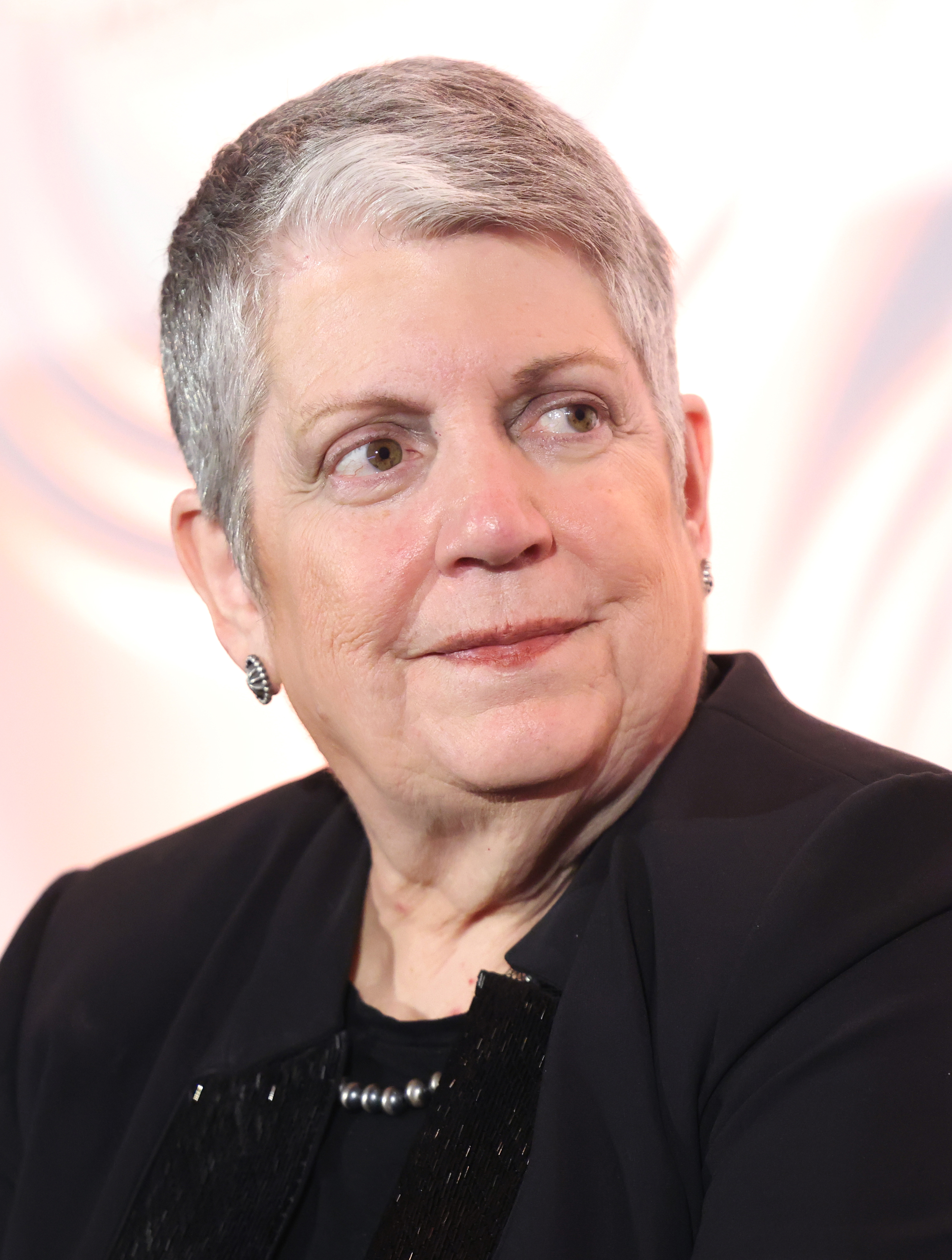
Janet Napolitano

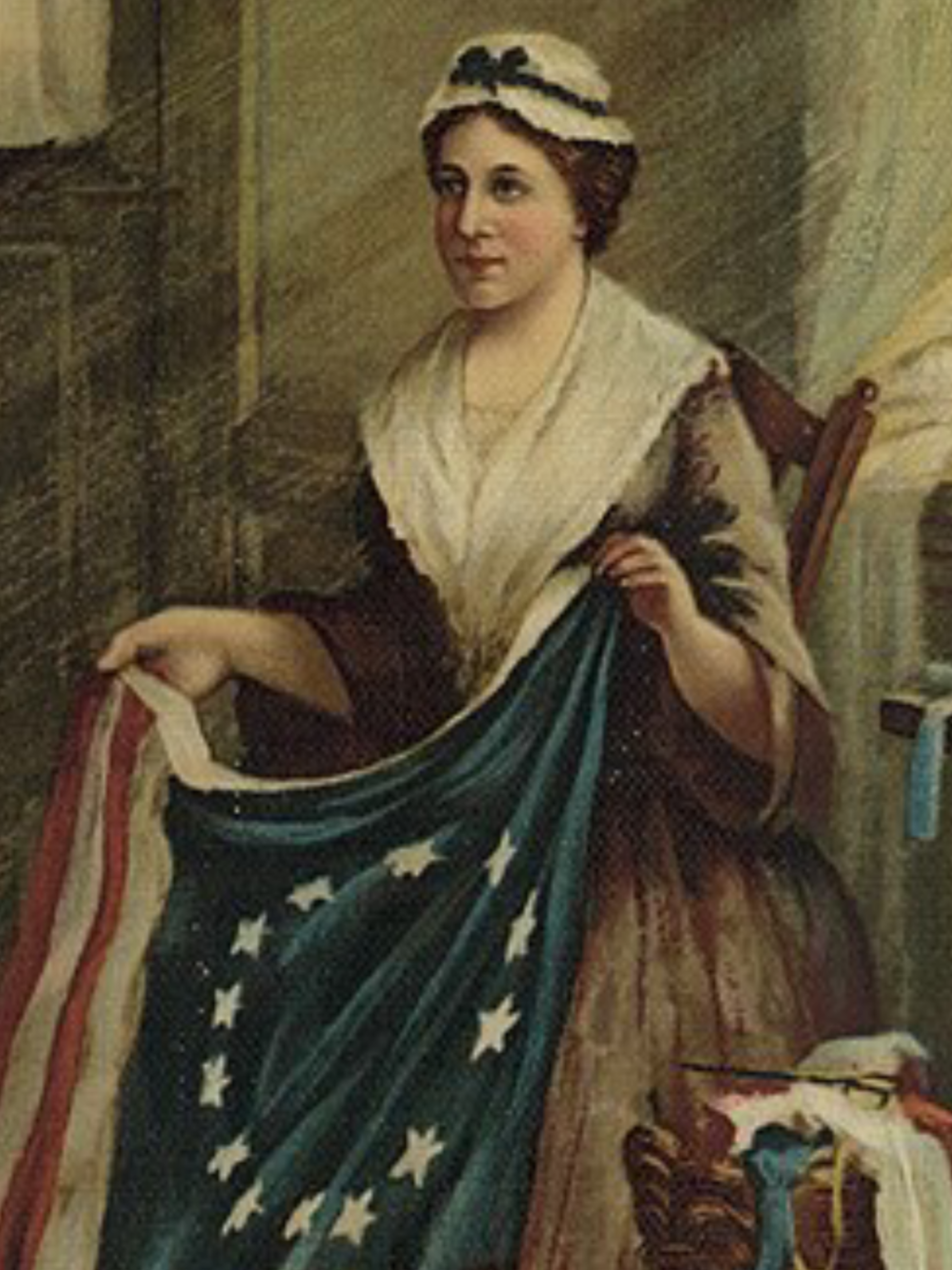
Betsy Ross

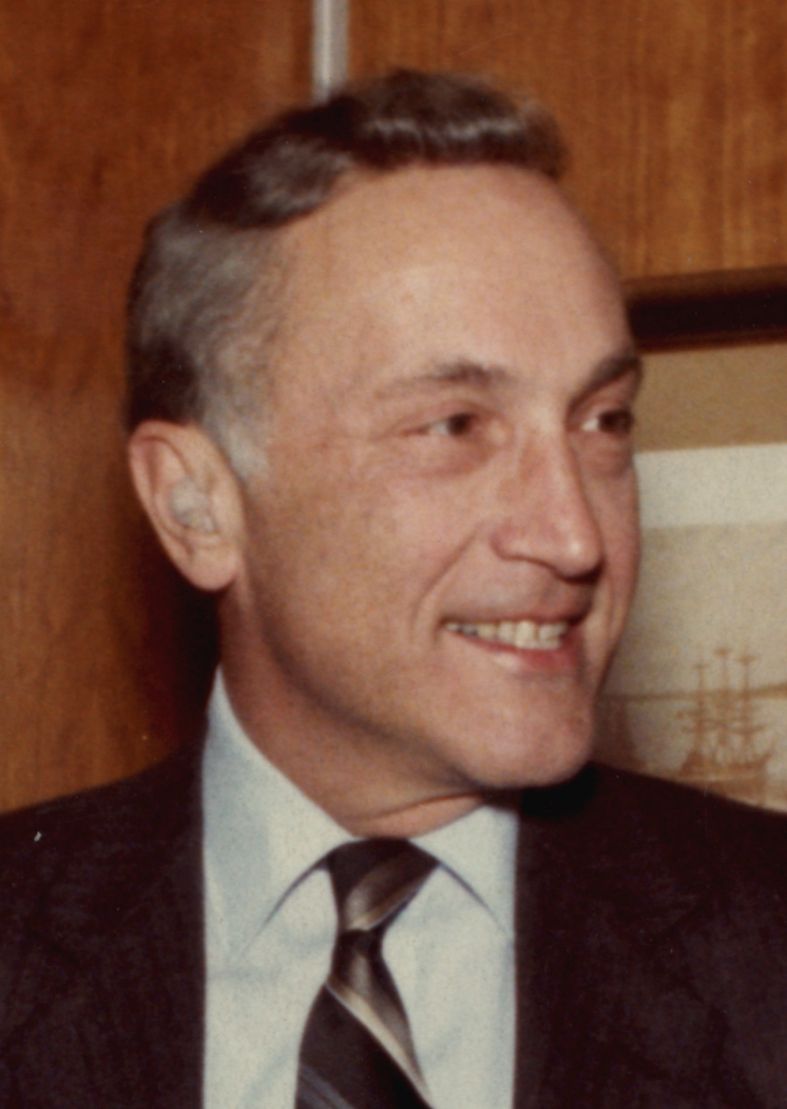
Richard Schweiker

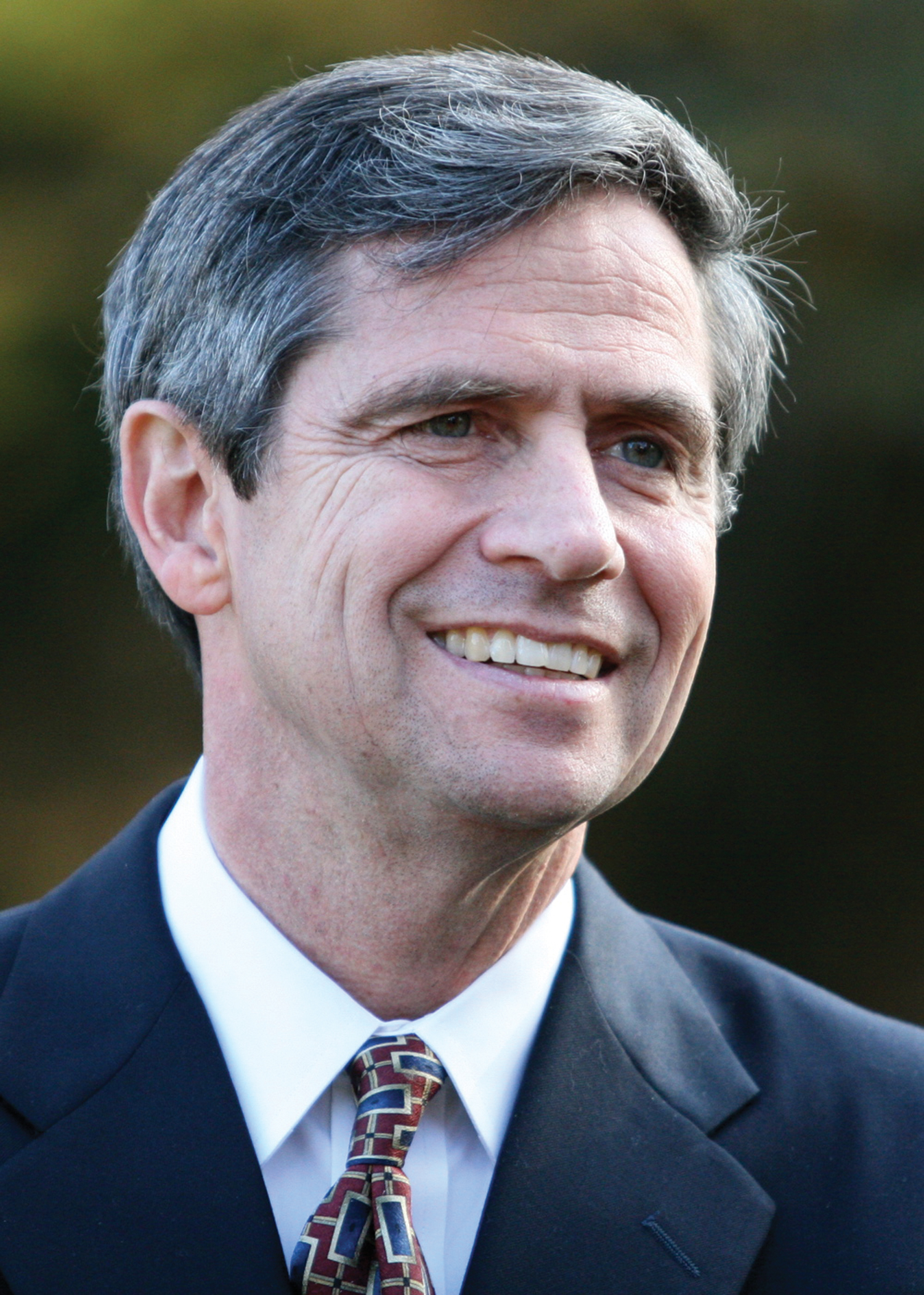
Joe Sestak

- Janet Napolitano, U.S. Secretary of Homeland Security—Pittsburgh
- Benjamin Netanyahu, prime minister of Israel—Cheltenham Township
- Clarence Charles Newcomer (1923–2005), US district judge of the United States District Court for the Eastern District of Pennsylvania
- John Olver, U.S. representative from Massachusetts—Honesdale
- Alexander Mitchell Palmer, U.S. attorney general, director of controversial Palmer Raids—White Haven
- Rand Paul, U.S. senator (R-KY)—Pittsburgh
- Ron Paul, U.S. House of Representatives (R-TX)—Pittsburgh
- Samuel W. Pennypacker, 23rd governor of Pennsylvania—Phoenixville
- Robert Reich, Secretary of Labor under Bill Clinton—Scranton
- Ed Rendell, 45th governor of Pennsylvania—Philadelphia
- George S. Rentz, World War II Navy chaplain and Navy Cross awardee—Lebanon
- Tom Ridge, governor, first Secretary of Homeland Security—Munhall
- Alice Rivlin, director of the Office of Management and Budget under Bill Clinton, vice chair of the Federal Reserve System—Philadelphia
- John Roll, federal judge slain in 2011 Tucson shooting in Arizona—Pittsburgh
- Dan Rooney, U.S. ambassador to Ireland—Pittsburgh
- Betsy Ross, credited maker of original American flag—Philadelphia
- Bayard Rustin, activist, organizer of social movements for civil rights, socialism, nonviolence, and gay rights—West Chester
- Richard Schweiker, congressman, senator, and Secretary of Health and Human Services under Ronald Reagan—Norristown
- Joe Sestak, Navy admiral and congressman—Secane
- Raymond P. Shafer, governor of Pennsylvania—New Castle
- Jeanne Shaheen, U.S. senator and governor of New Hampshire—Selinsgrove
- Don Sherwood, U.S. representative (R-PA)—Tunkhannock
- D. Brooks Smith, federal judge on Court of Appeals—Altoona
- Carl Andrew Spaatz, WWII general and first Chief of Staff of the U.S. Air Force—Boyertown
- Arlen Specter, U.S. senator (R-PA)—Philadelphia
- William Cameron Sproul, 27th governor of Pennsylvania—Lancaster County
- Thaddeus Stevens, constitutional activist—Gettysburg
- William A. Stone, 22nd governor of Pennsylvania—Wellsboro
- Edwin Sydney Stuart, 24th governor of Pennsylvania—Philadelphia
- Lawrence Summers, director of National Economic Council under Barack Obama—Penn Valley
- Gregory Tony (born 1978), sheriff of Broward County, Florida—Philadelphia
- Charlemagne Tower, lawyer, mining magnate and landowner—Pottsville
- Samuel Van Leer, Pennsylvania Irons works owner and a United States Army officer—Chester County
- Tom Vilsack, U.S. Secretary of Agriculture, governor of Iowa—Pittsburgh
- Alfred L. Wilson, U.S. Army Medal of Honor recipient—Fairchance
- Curtin Winsor Jr., U.S. ambassador to Costa Rica under Ronald Reagan—Philadelphia
- Richard Winters, 101st Airborne, 506th E Company, World War II—Lancaster

== Radio and television ==
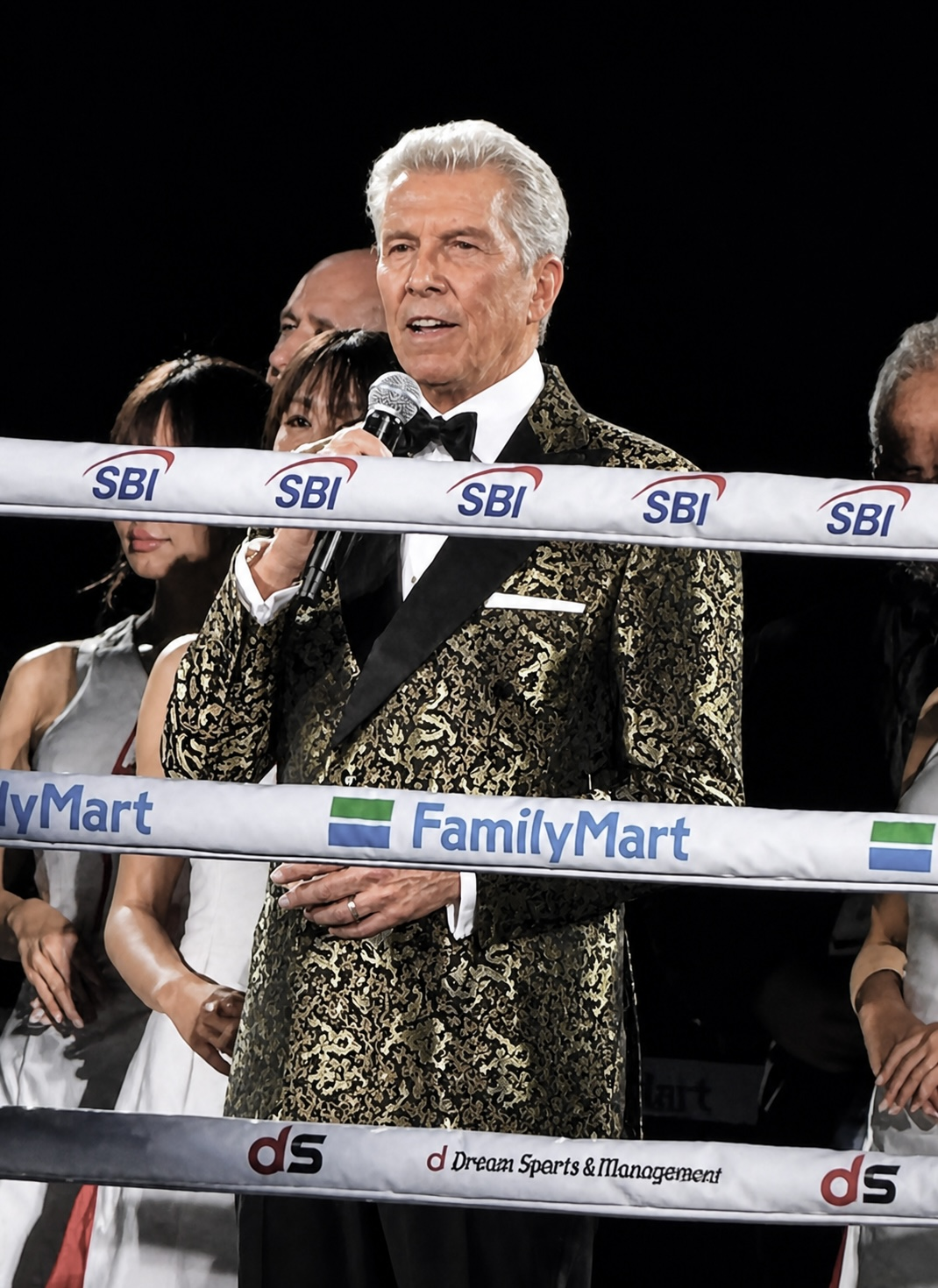
Michael Buffer

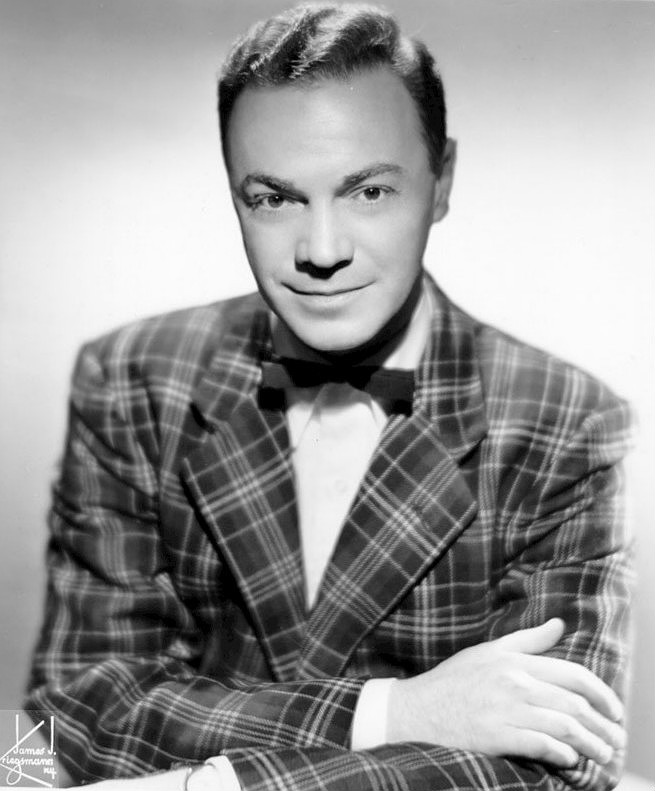
Alan Freed

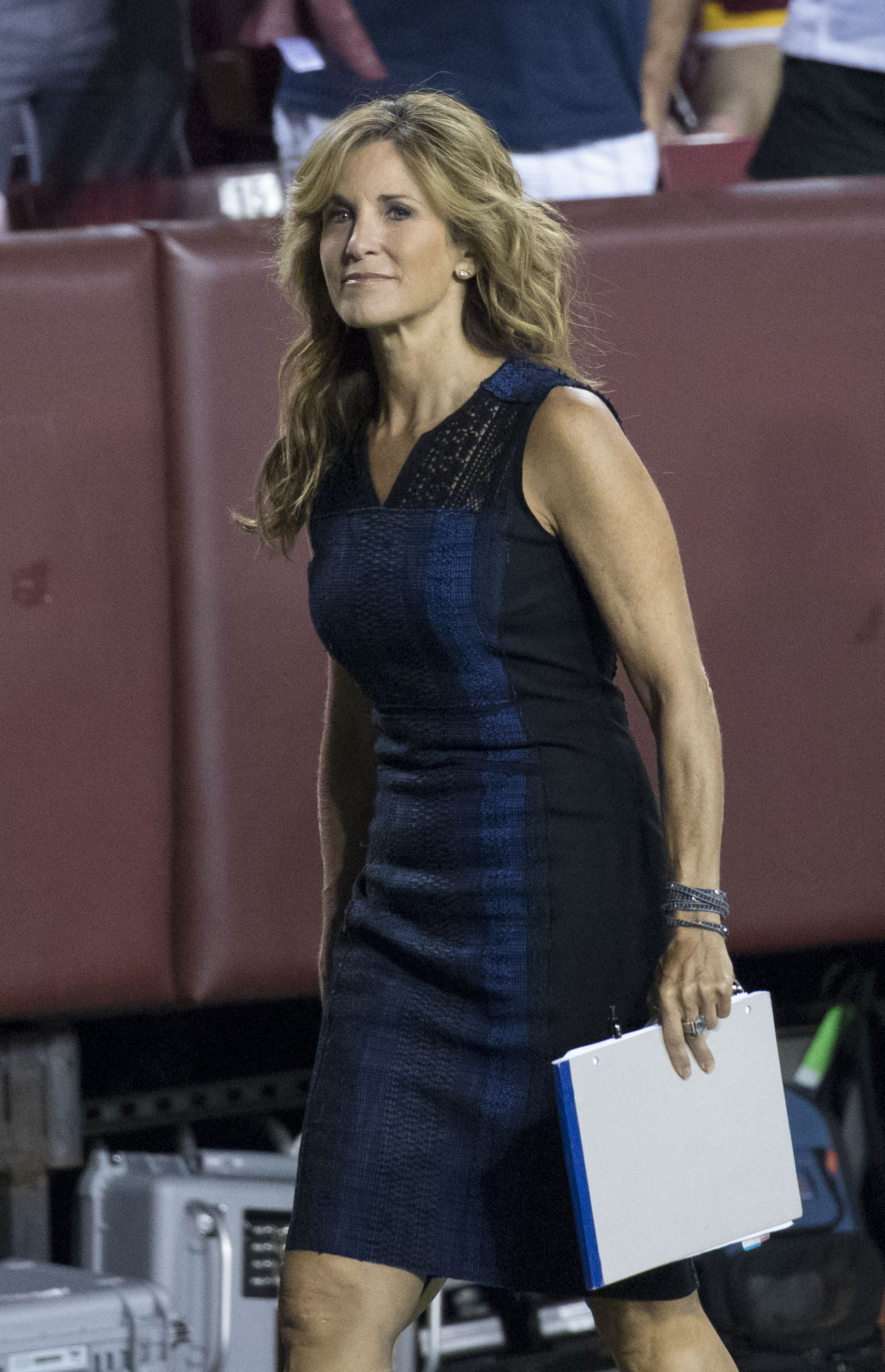
Suzy Kolber

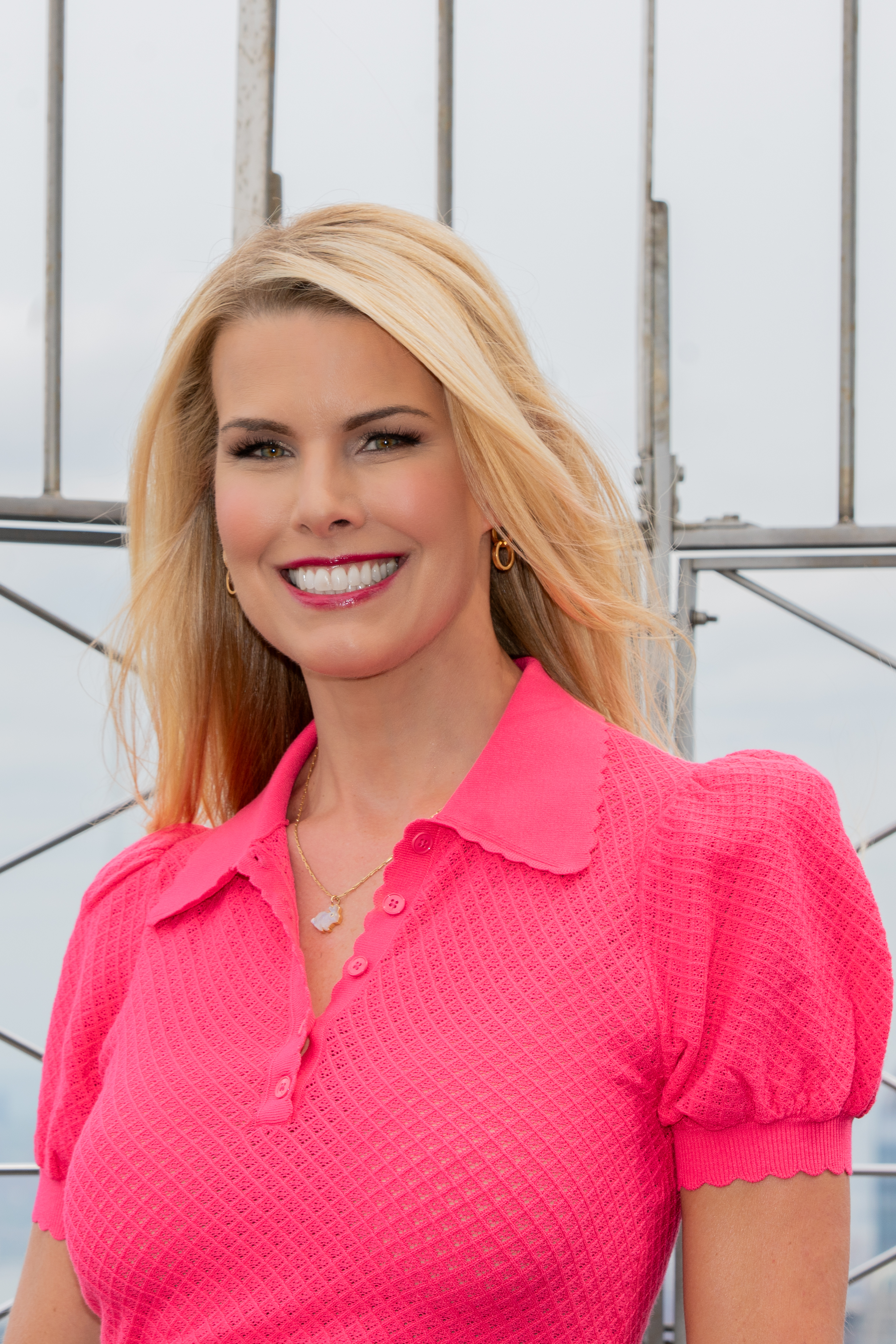
Beth Ostrosky Stern

- Jodi Applegate, broadcast journalist—Moon Township
- Michael Barkann, radio talk show host, television host—Newtown Square
- Chuck Barris, television host and producer—Philadelphia
- John Batchelor, radio talk show host—Bryn Mawr / Lower Merion Township
- Jaiden Nichols, YouTuber—Pittsburgh
- Ron Bennington, radio personality and comedian, The Ron and Fez Show—Philadelphia
- Jerry Blavat, disc jockey—Philadelphia
- Neal Boortz, libertarian radio talk show host—Bryn Mawr
- Michael Buffer, ring announcer known for his trademarked catchphrase, "Let's get ready to rumble!"—Philadelphia / Roslyn
- Steve Burns, original host of the kids' show Blue's Clues—Boyertown
- Steve Capus, former president of NBC News—Bryn Mawr
- Todd Christensen, sports broadcaster for the MountainWest Sports Network—Bellefonte
- Myron Cope, former Pittsburgh Steelers radio personality—Pittsburgh
- Regis Cordic, former radio personality; actor in Columbo, Gunsmoke—Pittsburgh
- Jim Cramer, television personality—Wyndmoor
- Bill Cullen, television personality—Pittsburgh
- Sharon Epperson, correspondent for CNBC—Pittsburgh
- Howard Eskin, Philadelphia-based sports radio personality—Philadelphia
- Debra Fox, television anchor—Pittsburgh
- Pauline Frederick, newspaper, TV, and radio journalist—Gallitzin
- Alan Freed, radio disc jockey who coined the term "Rock and Roll"—Windber
- Courtney Friel, entertainment reporter for Fox News—Norristown
- Louis Glackens, illustrator—Philadelphia
- Jon & Kate Gosselin, reality TV personalities (Jon & Kate Plus 8), family of 10 with sextuplets and twins—Wyomissing
- Andy Gresh, talk show host, television host, color commentator—Brownsville
- Rich Gunning, announcer—Philadelphia
- Marc Lamont Hill, BET News correspondent, CNN political commentator—Philadelphia
- Marilyn Horne, opera singer—Bradford
- Abby Huntsman, co-host of Fox & Friends Weekend—Philadelphia
- Kylie Kelce, podcaster of Not Gonna Lie—Narberth
- Suzy Kolber, television sportscaster—Upper Dublin Township
- Andrea Kremer, television sportscaster—Philadelphia
- Carson Kressley, TV personality, Queer Eye, How to Look Good Naked—Allentown
- Mark Levin, radio talk show host, conservative political commentator—Cheltenham Township
- Joe Lunardi, college basketball analyst for ESPN—Philadelphia
- Meredith Marakovits, New York Yankees clubhouse reporter for the YES Network—Walnutport
- Bam Margera, reality television personality and skateboarder—West Chester
- Chris Matthews, political commentator, MSNBC's Hardball—Philadelphia
- Billy Mays, TV direct-response advertising salesman and star of Discovery Channel's Pitchmen—McKees Rocks
- Michael Medved, talk radio host, conservative commentator, film critic—Philadelphia
- Jeanne Moos, broadcast journalist for CNN—Pittsburgh
- Clayton Morris, co-host of Fox & Friends Weekend—Spring Township
- Charlie O'Donnell, radio/TV announcer, primarily on game shows—Philadelphia
- Beth Ostrosky, model, judge on ABC's True Beauty and host of G4's Filter—Pittsburgh
- Victoria Pedretti, actress in The Haunting series and You — Fairless Hills
- Billy Porter, actor in Pose and Broadway performer in Kinky Boots—Pittsburgh
- Jack Posobiec, correspondent for One America News Network—Norristown
- Fred Rogers, television personality, Mr. Rogers' Neighborhood—Latrobe
- Norman Rose, radio announcer (NBC's Dimension X and CBS Radio Mystery Theater)—Philadelphia
- Ryan Sampson, radio personality, The Morning Mash Up, Sirius XM Hits 1—Titusville
- Ray Scott, sportscaster for the Green Bay Packers—Johnstown
- Steve Scully, host of C-SPAN's Washington Journal—Erie
- Paul Shannon, host of Adventuretime, WTAE Channel 4—Crafton
- Dick Stockton, sportscaster for Fox Sports and Turner Sports—Philadelphia
- Andrea Tantaros, political analyst and commentator on Fox News and Fox Business Network—Allentown
- Jake Tapper, presenter anchor for CNN, The Lead with Jake Tapper, State of the Union—Philadelphia
- Jesse Watters, author, commentator for Fox News, host of Watters' World—Philadelphia
- Kristen Welker, broadcast journalist for NBC News—Philadelphia
- Maddie Ziegler, actor, featured dancer on Dance Moms—Murrysville

== Religion ==
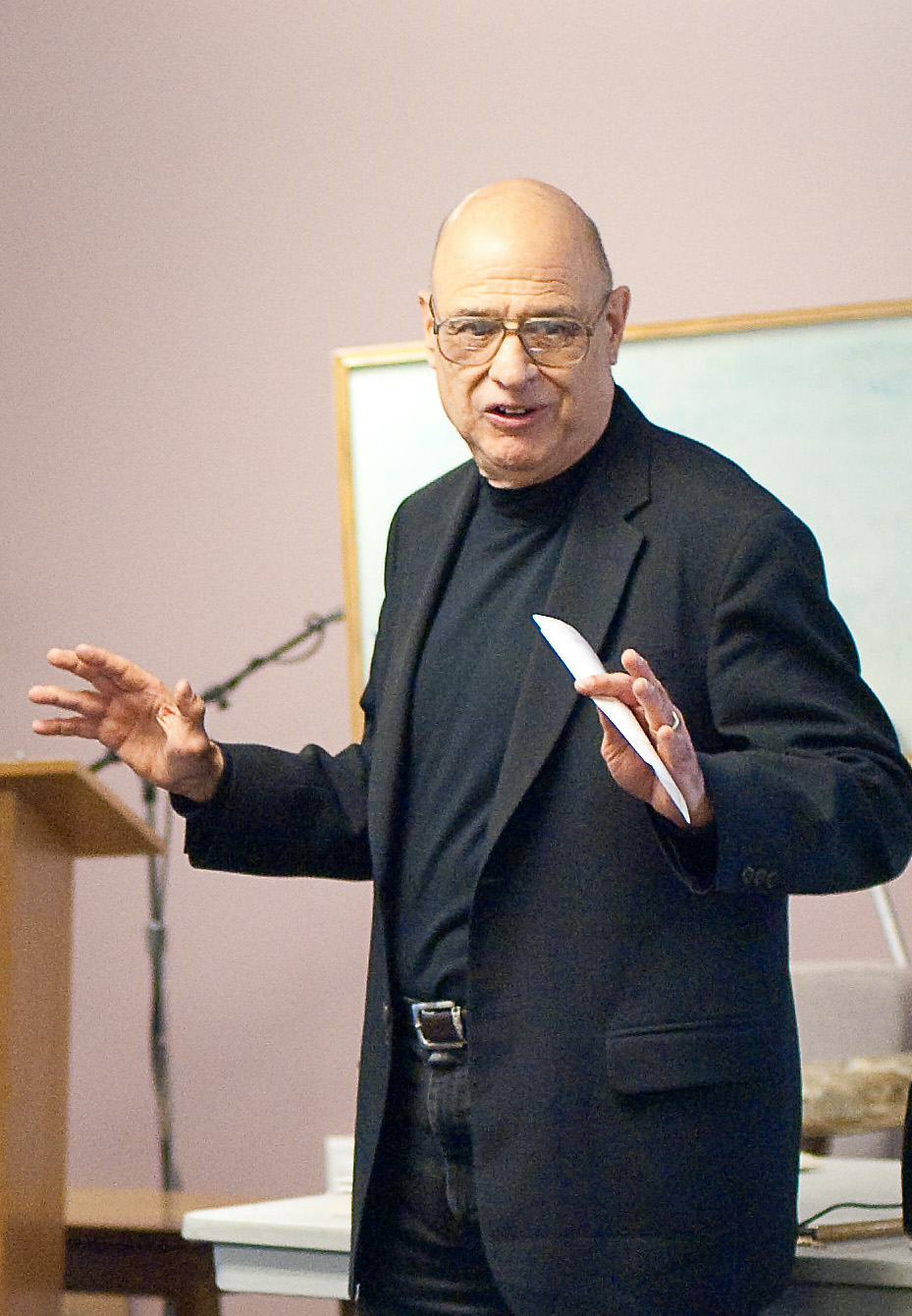
Tony Campolo

- Tony Campolo—Philadelphia
- Fanny DuBois Chase—Great Bend
- Walter Ciszek—Shenandoah
- Harvey Cox—Malvern
- Mary Helen Peck Crane—Wilkes-Barre
- Amy Eilberg—Philadelphia
- Prince Demetrius Gallitzin—Cambria County
- Washington Gladden—Pottsgrove
- Lillian Resler Harford—Mount Pleasant
- Barry Lynn—Harrisburg / Bethlehem
- Jeanette DuBois Meech—Frankford
- Bruce Metzger—Middletown
- Mary A. Miller—Allegheny
- David Miscavige—Bucks County
- Joseph Murgas—Wilkes Barre / Slovakia
- Michael Novak—Johnstown
- Charles Taze Russell—Pittsburgh
- A.W. Tozer—La Jose
- Rev. Jeremiah Wright—Philadelphia

== Social scientists and academics ==
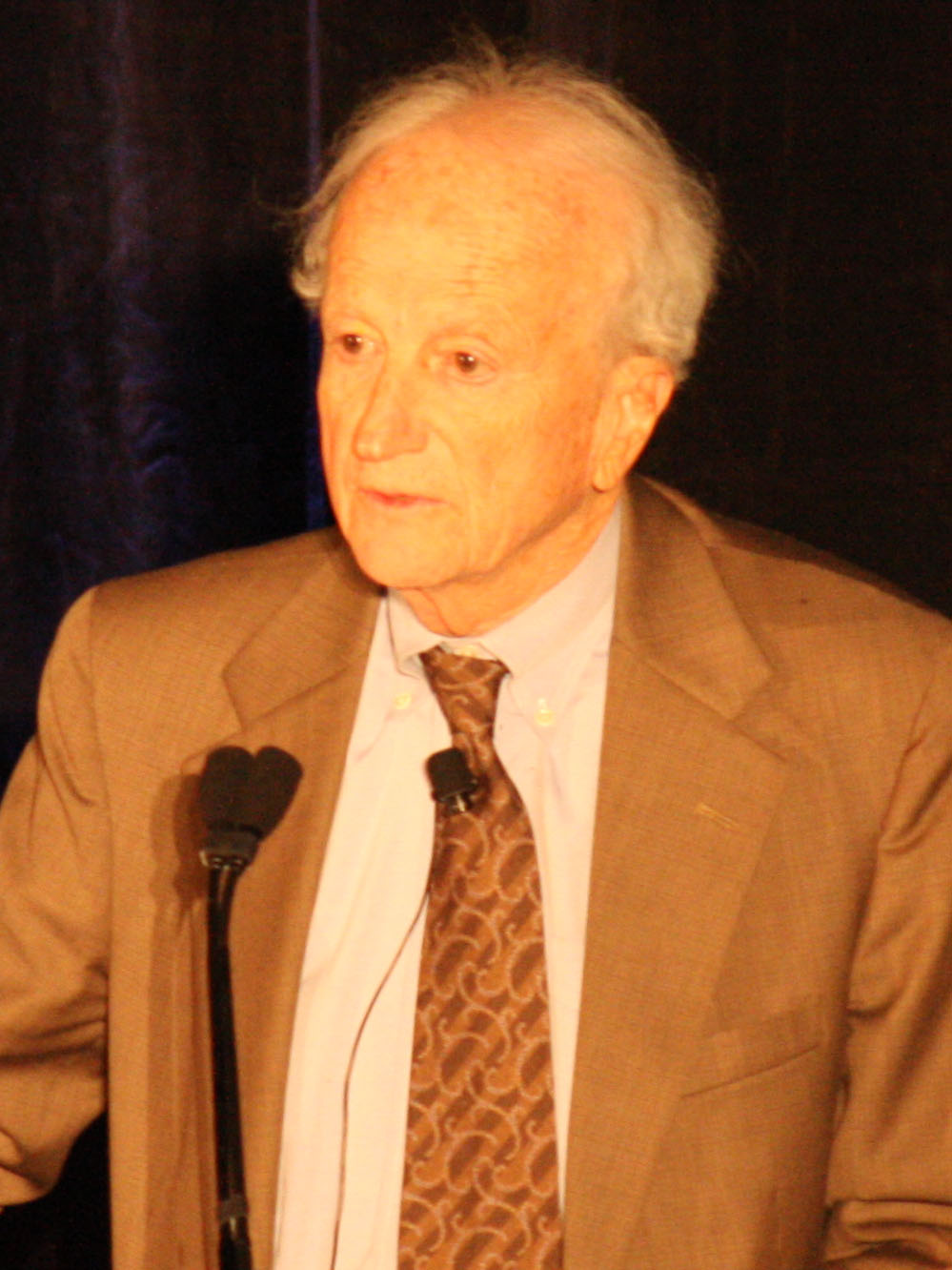
Gary Becker

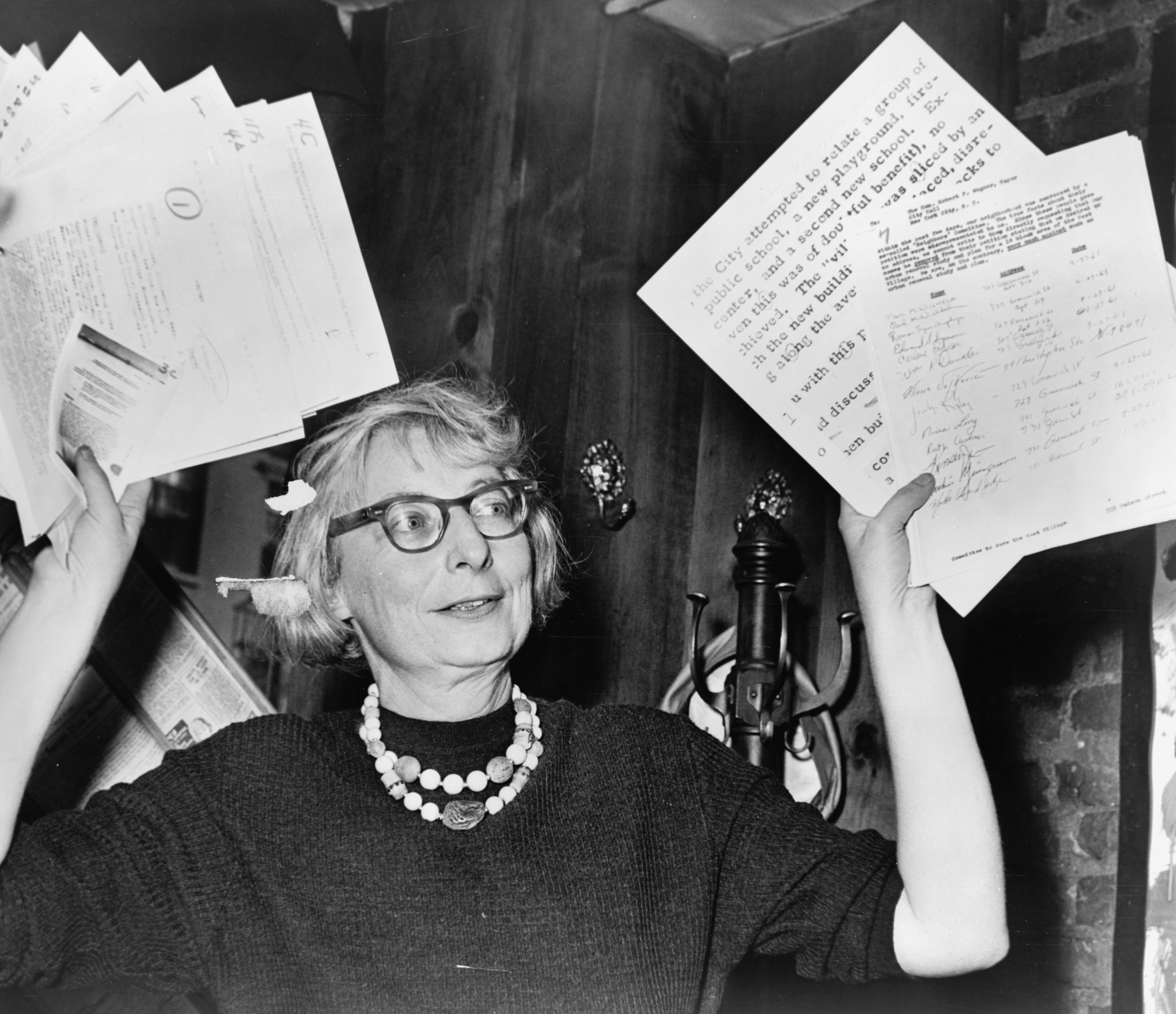
Jane Jacobs

- Russell L. Ackoff—Philadelphia
- Clayton Alderfer—Sellersville
- Gary Becker—Pottsville
- Julian Bond—Philadelphia
- Edwin Boring—Philadelphia
- Leonard Burman—Philadelphia
- Paul Cameron—Pittsburgh
- John D. Caputo—Philadelphia
- Henry Charles Carey—Philadelphia
- Leonard Carmichael—Philadelphia
- James McKeen Cattell—Easton
- Noam Chomsky—Philadelphia
- Randolph Cohen—Philadelphia
- Leda Cosmides—Philadelphia
- Robert Costanza—Pittsburgh
- Albert Ellis—Pittsburgh
- Joshua Fishman—Philadelphia
- W. Nelson Francis—Philadelphia
- Harry Frankfurt—Langhorne
- Walter Freeman—Philadelphia
- Howard Gardner—Scranton
- Henry George—Philadelphia
- Douglas Holtz-Eakin—Pittsburgh
- Noel Ignatiev—Philadelphia
- Jane Jacobs—Scranton
- Jacob Kantor—Harrisburg
- William Keen—Philadelphia
- Sally Kohn—Allentown
- Donald N. Levine—New Castle
- Edward B. Lewis—Wilkes-Barre
- Esther J. Trimble Lippincott—Kimberton
- John McWhorter—Philadelphia
- Margaret Mead—Philadelphia / Doylestown
- Robert K. Merton—Philadelphia
- Albert Jay Nock—Scranton
- Hilary Putnam—Philadelphia
- Robert Reich—Scranton
- David Riesman—Philadelphia
- Clinton Rossiter—Philadelphia
- Michael Rubin—Philadelphia
- B. F. Skinner—Susquehanna
- Jude Wanniski—Pottsville
- Walter Williams—Philadelphia
- Alan Wolfe—Philadelphia
- Michael Yates—Pittsburgh
- Robert Yerkes—Breadysville, Bucks County

== Others ==
- Ellen Greenberg (1983–2011), teacher, died either of suicide or homicide
- Edwarda O'Bara, woman who spent 42 years in a coma—Johnstown
- Sarah Knauss, supercentenarian and oldest known person in American history—Hollywood, Luzerne County

== See also ==
- List of Pennsylvania suffragists
- List of people from Erie, Pennsylvania
- List of people from Lancaster County, Pennsylvania
- List of people from Philadelphia
- List of people from the Lehigh Valley
- List of people from the Pittsburgh metropolitan area
- List of people from State College, Pennsylvania
- List of people from York, Pennsylvania
