= Titusville Area High School =

Coordinates: 41.62977°N 79.66866°W

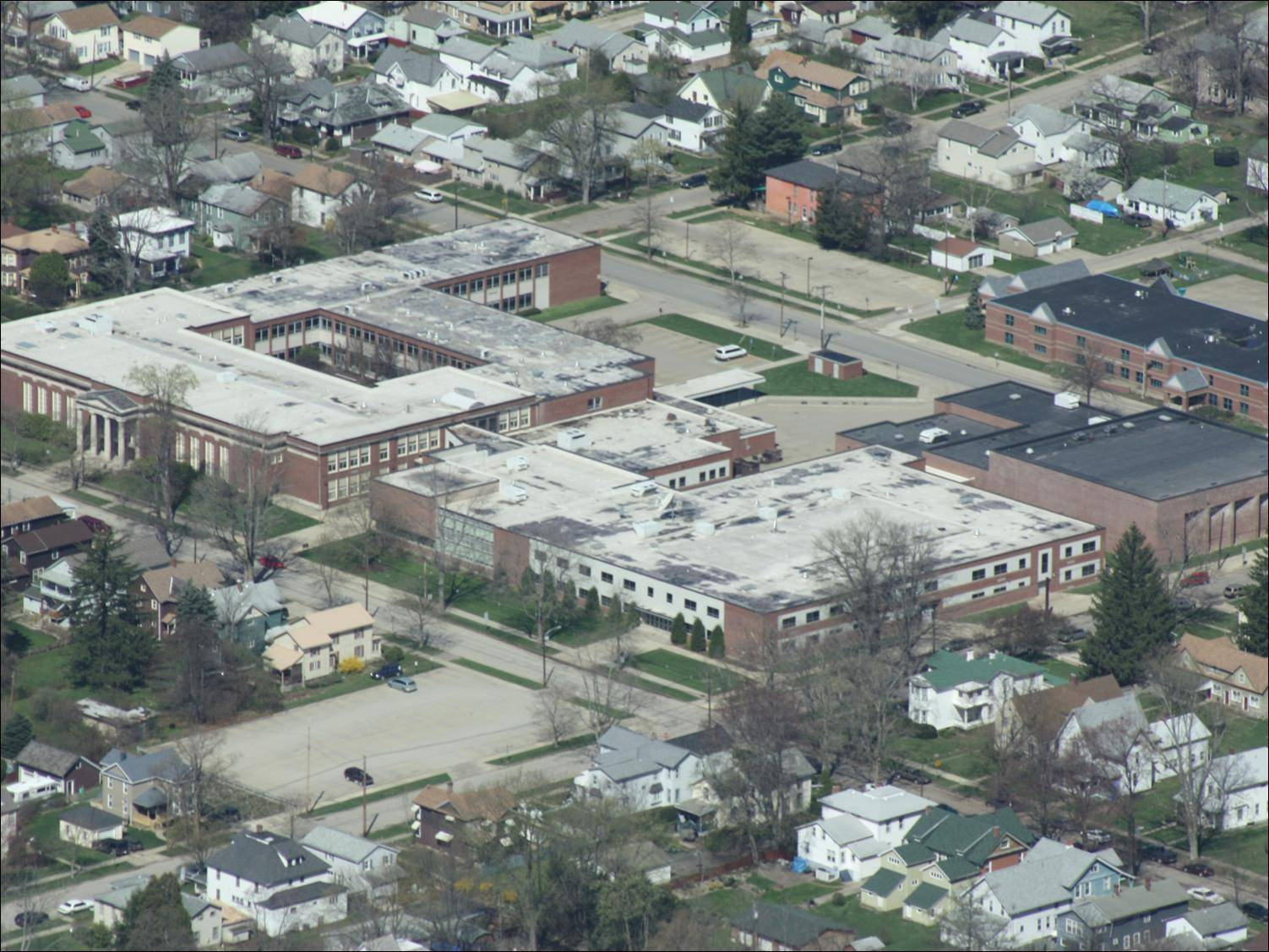

Location
- 302 E. Walnut Street; Titusville, Pennsylvania 16354

Information
- School type: Public High School
- Opened: 1931
- School district: Titusville Area
- Principal: Phillip Knapp
- Teaching staff: 43.39 (FTE)
- Grades: 9-12
- Enrollment: 583 (2023-2024)
- Student to teacher ratio: 13.44
- Colors: Brown and Gold
- Athletics conference: PIAA District X
- Mascot: Rockets
- Feeder schools: Titusville Middle School

Titusville Area High School is a public high school in Titusville, Pennsylvania. The school serves about 660 students in grades 9-12. The main feeder school is Titusville Middle School.

== School history ==
Titusville Area High School was originally constructed in 1931. It was financed and given to the community by Mary Colestock in honor of her husband. Subsequent additions took place in 1941, 1957, and 1965, at which time the junior high wing was added. More additions, along with a major renovation took place in 1979, at which time a 25-meter swimming pool was added. The junior high students moved from the school to a sole middle school building in 1999, after which, a major renovation took place to the entire structure including improvements for energy-efficiency and student safety.

Titusville High School has an active alumni association that was organized in 1996 and has an endowed scholarship fund that exceeds one million dollars. Ida Tarbell graduated from Titusville High School in 1896 and is one of its most famous graduates. Another well-known graduate was John Heisman who began his football career by playing on the high school team for three years before graduating in 1887.

== Athletics ==
Titusville Area is part of PIAA District 10

Boys Sports

- Baseball - AA
- Basketball - AAA
- Cross Country - AA
- Football - AA
- Golf - AAAA
- Soccer AA
- Swimming and Diving - AA
- Tennis - AA
- Track and Field - AA
- Wrestling - AAA

Girls Sports

- Basketball - AAA
- Cross Country - AA
- Soccer - AA
- Softball - AA
- Swimming and Diving - AA
- Track and Field - AA
- Volleyball - AA

== Alumni ==
- J.J Bleday - MLB Player
- Shane Callahan - actor
- H. Harrison Haskell - member of the Pennsylvania House of Representatives from the 6th district (1971–1978)
- John Heisman - NFL Player and Coach. The best college player receives a trophy called the Heisman trophy which is named after him.
- Mason Levi - Singer
- Ida Tarbell - Author and Journalist
- Ray Tesser - American Football Player
