= Dane Rauschenberg =

American long-distance runner

- Dane Rauschenberg running the Buffalo Marathon in 2006
- Born: May 31, 1976 (age 50); Titusville, Pennsylvania, U.S.
- Known for: Charity marathon runner

Dane Rauschenberg (born May 31, 1976) is an American long-distance runner and author who ran 52 marathons, one every weekend, throughout 2006. He raised over $43,000 for charity, as part of an effort he called "Fiddy2".

== Background ==
Rauschenberg was born in Titusville, Pennsylvania, where he set numerous records as a high school swimmer. While earning varsity letters in track and field, running was not what he saw himself competing in. After attempting to walk onto the Penn State football team, Rauschenberg played rugby for two years before graduating in 1998. He then attended law school at Penn State Dickinson Law where he began running to get into shape after putting on weight after college. After law school, and during a clerkship in Erie, PA, Rauschenberg began running more. What would be a precursor to his long-distance athletic prowess, but was lost on Rauschenberg at the time was his winning the Presque Isle Endurance Classic - a 12 hour run where Dane amassed 84 miles.

Leading up to Rauschenberg's 2006 effort, he ran a few marathons, qualifying for and running the Boston Marathon. Rauschenberg's first marathon was the Harrisburg Marathon in 2001, which he finished in a time of 4:12:07, 159th overall of 281 finishers. Rauschenberg also ran the 2004 Marine Corps Marathon in 3:31:13, in 685th place.

Before 2006, some runners tried to see how many marathons they could run on consecutive weekends. For example, Richard Worley had run a marathon on each of 159 consecutive weekends. Others attempted to see how many different marathons could be completed within a single calendar year, with some runners reaching 90. However, his enterprise competed for public attention with at least three other contemporaneous efforts, two of which involved running 50 marathons on 50 consecutive days.

== Running ==
=== Fiddy2: 52 marathons in 2006 ===
Rauschenberg called his effort "Fiddy2," which in the initial planning stages, did not have a charity fund raising component. After contacting the First Light Marathon in Mobile, Alabama in the year prior to running the 52 marathons, Rauschenberg selected its beneficiary, the Mobile chapter of L'Arche, to be the recipient of his efforts. He obtained partial assistance for his effort in the form of race entry fee waivers, free meals from a local restaurant, free running shoes, and a free website. Rauschenberg reports that he did not obtain monetary donations to offset Fiddy2's costs, and estimated that total travel expenses related to the effort would be $20,000. Rauschenberg distributed weekly press releases to promote the fundraising effort, submitted blog postings, and spoke at marathon events throughout the year, participating as featured as a runner on race's websites and various blogs, including being part of a small group of "rock stars" noted by the Little Rock Marathon. Rauschenberg sought radio, television, and print coverage to raise awareness about the fundraising marathon project with a website and blog.

During the project, he ran marathons in Florida, Alabama, Maryland, Arkansas, Virginia, District of Columbia, Ohio, Indiana, Delaware, New York, California, West Virginia, Colorado, Washington, Oregon, Maine, Wisconsin, Nevada, Utah, New Mexico, Pennsylvania, Illinois, Texas, Missouri, Alaska, the Cayman Islands, and three in Canada.

Late in the year, to preserve his streak of marathons, Rauschenberg organized the Drake Well Marathon consisting of 105.5 laps around the track at Titusville High School, his hometown's high school, as he was not aware of any other certified race scheduled for the Christmas weekend at the time. The race was limited to 25 runners, with 21 runners from nine states participating, and was the penultimate event of his effort.

Fiddy2 was one of at least four charity fundraising projects in 2006 that involved a runner running 50 or more marathons during that year. Rauschenberg ran his 52 consecutive weekly marathons in 2006 with an average time of 3:21:16. In recognition of Rauschenberg's efforts, he was named by the marathonguide.com website (a marathon reference website) as one of the 20 outstanding USA marathon runners for 2006, as part of an effort to recognize those individuals whose participation in multiple marathons "show that marathoning is and can be part of one's regular routine." The 52nd and final race was run on December 31, 2006, with $32,000 raised at that time.

In 2007, Rauschenberg switched his career to race organizing and as a motivational speaker discussing his 52-marathon experience and offering suggestions about running as an aspect of a healthy lifestyle.

=== Running 202-mile American Odyssey Relay solo ===
In 2010, Rauschenberg ran the American Odyssey Relay, usually a 12 (or 6) person relay covering the 202 miles (325 km) from Gettysburg, Pennsylvania to Washington, D.C., in the time of 50 hours and 16 minutes by himself.

A documentary entitled "No Handoffs" was made about the effort and successfully funded by Kickstarter in 2014.

=== 350-mile run on the Oregon Coast ===
In 2012, Rauschenberg ran the 350-mile (560 km) length of the Oregon Coast, from the border of California to the border of Washington state in seven days. Rauschenberg spent an entire week running the full length of the Oregon coast averaging about 50 miles (80 km) a day. Stopping at four coastal high schools along the way, and returning to Portland on April 9 to visit a fifth high school, Rauschenberg's mission was to send a healthy message to kids.

== Awards and recognition ==
- Asked to participate as a "charity chaser" at the 2007 Frederick Marathon, the first in race history, where he would start last and raise five dollars for every runner he passed during the race. He reprised this role again at both the Baltimore, Pittsburgh, and San Francisco marathons.
- Selected co-Male Runner of the Year by the Washington Running Club in 2006.

== Books ==
- See Dane Run, Experience Publishers (December 17, 2008) ISBN 978-0968315859
- 138,336 Feet to Pure Bliss: What I Learned about Life, Women (and Running) in My 1st 100 Marathons, Bush Street Publishing (March 16, 2012) ISBN 978-1937445249
- Running With The Girls, Booklocker.com, Inc., with Lacie Whyte (November 15, 2014) ISBN 978-1634900713
- Run This Place: 52 Must Run Races in North America , Trinity Press (May 14, 2018) ISBN 978-0991594016
- Ignore The Impossible , Mascot Books (December 2019) ISBN 978-1645433118

== See also ==
- Competing in a series of marathons
