= Ray Tesser =

American football player (1912–1982)

No. 40
- Positions: End, defensive end

Personal information
- Born: June 2, 1912; Titusville, Pennsylvania, U.S.
- Died: November 2, 1982 (aged 70); Corry, Pennsylvania, U.S.
- Listed height: 6 ft 2 in (1.88 m)
- Listed weight: 204 lb (93 kg)

Career information
- High school: Titusville (PA)
- College: Carnegie Mellon

Career history
- Pittsburgh Pirates (1933–1934)
- Stats at Pro Football Reference

Raymond Charles Tesser (June 2, 1912 – November 2, 1982) was an American professional football player who played two seasons with the Pittsburgh Pirates of the National Football League (NFL). He played college football at Carnegie Mellon University.

== Early life ==
Tesser graduated with high honors from Titusville High School in Titusville, Pennsylvania in 1930. He lettered in baseball, basketball, and football all four years of high school. He was inducted into the Titusville Area School District Athletic Hall of Fame in 2001.

== College career ==
Tesser played football for two years at Carnegie Mellon University, enrolling in the Carnegie Institute of Technology.

== Professional career ==
Tesser played in 23 games for the Pittsburgh Pirates from 1933 to 1934, starting 11 of them. He had 19 receptions for 349 yards in his career.
