= Peter Ashmun Ames =

American British-Army intelligence officer and member of the Cairo Gang (1888-1920)

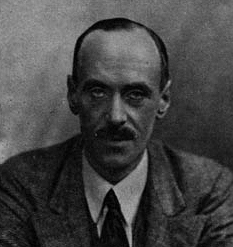
- Born: June 10, 1888; Titusville, Pennsylvania
- Died: November 21, 1920 (aged 32); Dublin, Ireland
- Cause of death: Murder by firearm
- Resting place: St Mary's Catholic Cemetery, Kensal Green, London, England
- Education: Stevens Institute of Technology
- Occupation: MI5 Operative
- Parent(s): Elias Hurlbut Ames and Eleanor Gray Bushnell
- Relatives: Joseph Bushnell Ames (brother); Daniel Bushnell (great-grandfather)

Peter Ashmun Ames (June 10, 1888 − November 21, 1920) was an American British Army intelligence officer and member of the Cairo Gang who was assassinated by the Irish Republican Army. Patrick Moran was later executed for his assassination.

== Early life ==
Peter Ashmun Ames was born on June 10, 1888, in Titusville, Pennsylvania, the son of Elias Hurlbut Ames (1851-1891) and Eleanor Gray Bushnell (1855-1946). Both Ames' father and maternal grandfather, Joseph Bushnell (1831-1918), came from old New England families and became wealthy during the Pennsylvania Oil Rush. Ames' great-grandfather was the Pittsburgh industrialist Daniel Bushnell. After Elias Ames' death in 1891 at age 39, Peter's mother moved the family to Morristown, New Jersey, where her children had a privileged upbringing in the town that was then known as an "inland Newport." Ames attended the Stevens Institute of Technology, graduating in 1911.

== Career ==
In 1912, Ames moved to London to take a position with a firm in the city. In 1917, he joined the elite Grenadier Guards of the British Army and fought in France during the First World War.

In June 1920, at the height of the Irish War of Independence, Ames moved to Dublin, Ireland on assignment from the British military intelligence, serving as an undercover agent for MI5. Along with the other members of the Cairo Gang spy ring, Ames worked to end the operations of Irish Republican Army and restore British control in Dublin.

The activities of the Cairo Gang were soon detected by Irish Republican Army leaders, however, who formulated a plot, led by Michael Collins, to eliminate the covert group.

== Personal life ==
Peter Ashmun Ames was engaged to marry Millicent Orr-Ewing, a niece of the Duke of Roxburghe and a close friend of Barbara Cartland, at the time of his death. Their engagement was announced in The New York Times the same day that Lt. Ames was assassinated by The Squad. Ames' brother, Joseph Bushnell Ames, was a prolific novelist, and his aunt, Alice Alden Bushnell, married a son of the lawyer George Goelet Kip. The philanthropist Mary Warden Harkness, wife of Charles W. Harkness, was the first cousin of Ames' mother Eleanor.

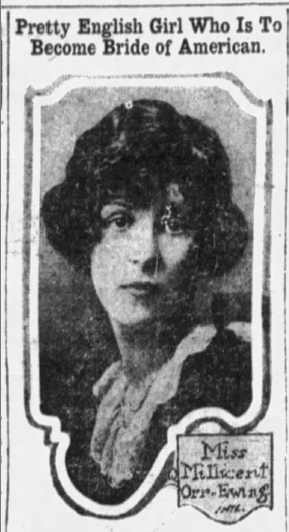
Ames' fiancée, Millicent Orr-Ewing

== Death ==
On the morning of Sunday, November 21, 1920, IRA gunmen stormed into the house at 38 Upper Mount Street where Ames and another agent were staying. Ames attempted to reach for the .45-caliber Colt pistol he had hidden beneath his pillow, but was held down by the gunmen before he could get to his weapon. After being made to stand facing the wall of his bedroom, Ames was shot six times in the back and killed.

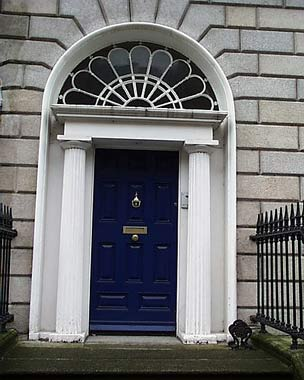
Front door of the house at 38 Upper Mount Street where Ames was killed.

One of the assassins, Vinny Byrne, wrote an account of the killings:

As I opened the folding-doors, the officer, who was in bed, was in the act of going for his gun under his pillow. Doyle and myself dashed into the room, at the same time ordering him to put up his hands, which he did. Doyle dashed around by the side of the bed, and pulled a Colt .45 from beneath the pillow. Right behind us came Frank Saurin and he started collecting from papers etc., which was his job. I remember looking into a drawer and seeing a Sinn Fein tie there and, if I am not mistaken, photographs of the 1916 leaders. I ordered the British officer to get out of bed. He asked me what was going to happen and I replied : 'Ah, nothing.' I then ordered him to march in front of me ... I marched my officer down to the back room where the other officer was. He was standing up in the bed, facing the wall. I ordered mine to do likewise. When the two of them were together I thought to myself 'The Lord have mercy on your souls ! ' I then opened fire with my Peter. They both fell dead.

The report delivered to the House of Lords on the murders of Bloody Sunday described the events at 38 Upper Mount as well:

This house was entered at 9.10 a.m. by twenty armed, unmasked men who were let in by a servant, Catherine Farrell, who unwillingly and under constraint pointed out the rooms occupied by Lieutenant Aimes, of the Grenadier Guards, and Lieutenant Bennett, of the R.A.S.C., Motor Transport. The maid rushed upstairs and warned an officer who was sleeping on the upper floor, and another male lodger, that murder was being done downstairs. A fusilade of shots was heard. When they came down-stairs they found two bodies in a pool of blood in Aimes's bedroom. Bennett had evidently been dragged from the bedroom in his bedclothes into his brother officer's room where both were shot together, their bodies lying side by side.

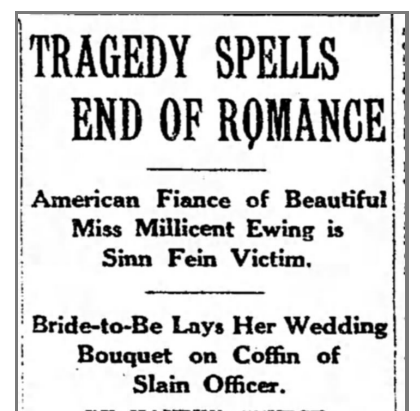
Newspaper article announcing death of Lieutenant Ames

As a result of Bloody Sunday, Patrick Moran and Thomas Whelan were tried for murder. Four other IRA men - Frank Flood, Thomas Bryan, Patrick Doyle and Bernard Ryan were convicted of high treason for the Drumcondra ambush on the 21 January 1921. All six IRA men were hanged at Mountjoy Prison on 14 March 1921.
