= Daniel Bushnell =

American industrialist

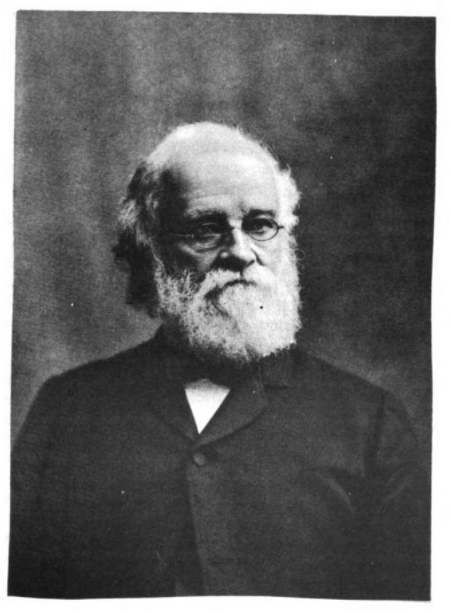
- Born: 1808; New York City
- Died: July 12, 1891 (aged 82–83); Pittsburgh
- Occupation: Industrialist
- Spouse: Eleanor Gray
- Parent(s): Alexander Bushnell and Sarah Wells
- Relatives: Joseph Bushnell Ames (great-grandson); Peter Ashmun Ames (great-grandson)

Daniel Bushnell (1808–1891) was an American industrialist and one of the early shareholders of the Standard Oil Company.

== Early life ==
Daniel Bushnell was born in New York City in 1808 to Alexander Bushnell (1771–1838) and Sarah Wells (1772–1849). In 1813, Bushnell's father Alexander, a ship carpenter, moved his family from New York to Pittsburgh, Pennsylvania.

== Career ==
In 1839, Daniel Bushnell entered the coal business in Pennsylvania, shipping coal from remote areas up the Monongahela River to population centers downstream. Previously, traders had thought that the cost in coal of using a steamboat to bring coal to ports down the Ohio river would exceed the amount of coal that a steamboat could deliver. In June 1845, however, Bushnell showed that towing coal down the Ohio was actually quite profitable, delivering 2,000 bushels of coal to Cincinnati on his tugboat, the "Walter Forward." In 1851 Bushnell built another towboat, the "Black Diamond," which was used to ship even more coal from the Pennsylvania mines to ports along the region's rivers. Bushnell hired the Captain J.J Vandergrift to captain his steamboats, and soon the two men were shipping coal as far as New Orleans. Bushnell's innovation brought about a boom in the Pennsylvania coal business, spurring growth in Pittsburgh and the surrounding towns.

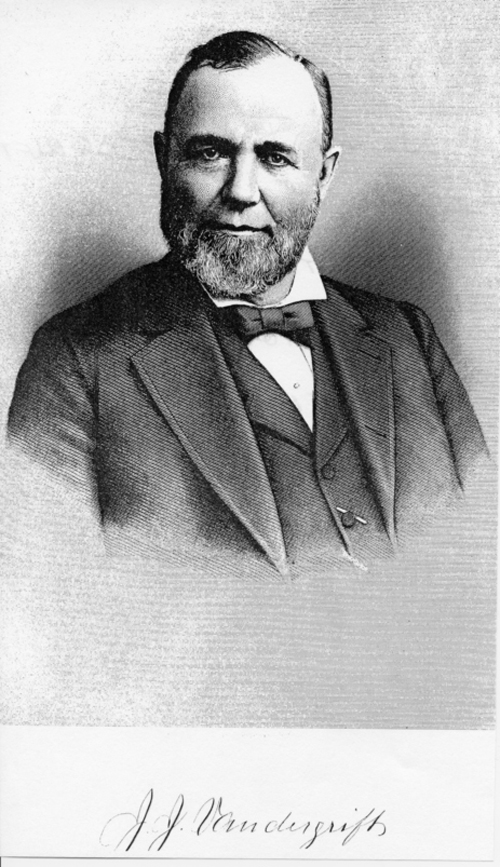
Daniel Bushnell's business partner, Captain Jacob Jay Vandergrift (1827–1899)

Bushnell also owned and operated a number of coal mines of his own, including the Hodgson Mine (opened 1843) and the Bushnell mine (opened 1840), both outside of Pittsburgh. In 1861 Bushnell left the coal business and began trading oil along the Allegheny River. Working with his sons Joseph, Thomas, John and Robert, as well as his old colleague Captain Vandergrift, Bushnell and his partners made a fortune by buying oil at the Venango oil wells and shipping it down the Allegheny River to Pittsburgh. The Bushnell family's oil operations were soon bought out by John D. Rockefeller's growing oil company in exchange for shares in Rockefeller's firm. As a result, Bushnell became one of the 37 original Standard Oil shareholders, owning 97 shares in 1878 (compared to Rockefeller's nearly 9,000). Daniel Bushnell died in Pittsburgh on July 12, 1891, leaving his large fortune to his seven surviving children.

== Personal life ==
Daniel Bushnell first married Eleanor Gray (1811–1854), with whom he had 14 children. His second wife was Elizabeth Hill, with whom Bushnell had three more children. One of Bushnell's daughters, Sarah Wells Bushnell, married another Standard Oil shareholder, William Gray Warden. Sarah and William Warden's daughter Mary Warden Harkness (1864–1916) was a philanthropist and the wife of Standard Oil heir Charles W. Harkness. Another one of Bushnell's granddaughters, Eleanor Bushnell Davis, married the engineer Morris Llewellyn Cooke. American intelligence officer Peter Ashmun Ames and novelist Joseph Bushnell Ames were Daniel's great-grandsons through his son Joseph. Daniel Bushnell's brother was the Reverend Wells Bushnell (1799–1863), a prominent Presbyterian minister.
