= A. Leo Weil =

American lawyer (1858–1938)

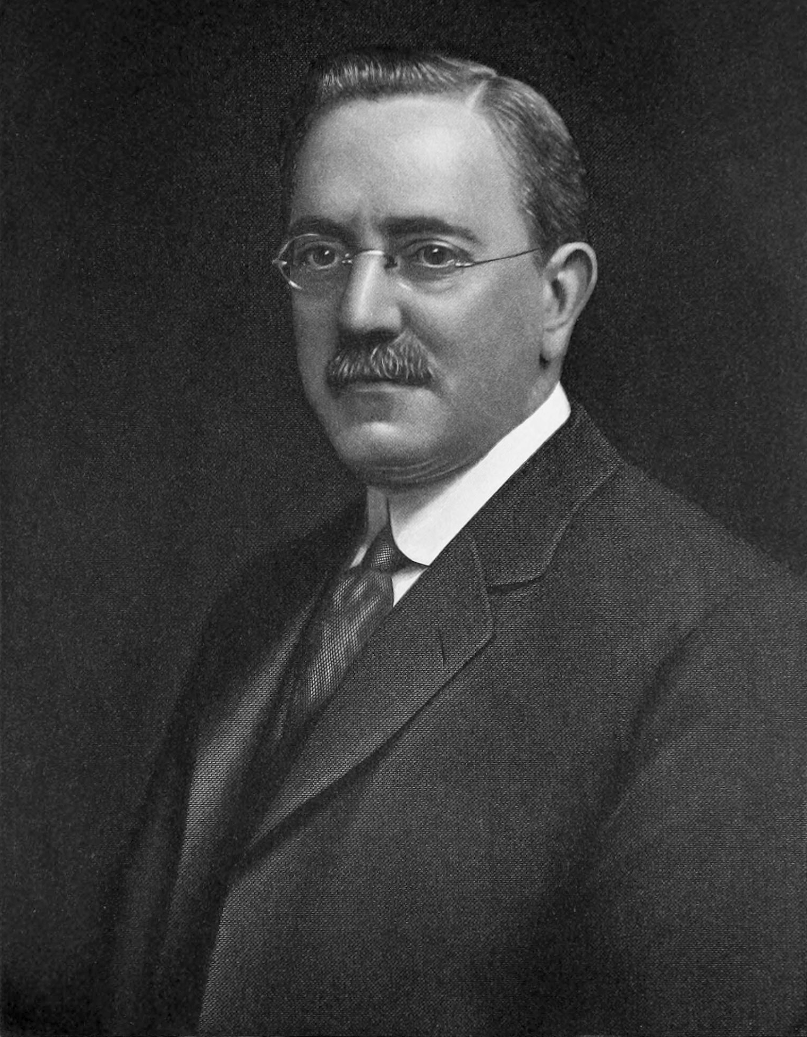
- Born: Adolphus Leo Weil; July 19, 1858; Keysville, Virginia
- Died: September 17, 1938 (aged 80); Pittsburgh, Pennsylvania
- Education: University of Virginia
- Occupation: Lawyer
- Spouse: Cassie Ritter (m. 1883)
- Children: 3

Signature
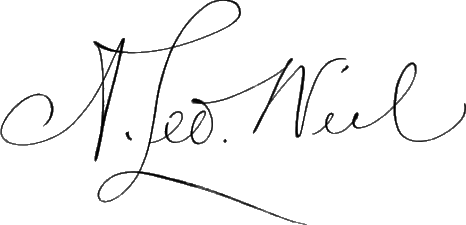

Adolphus Leo Weil (July 19, 1858 – September 17, 1938) was a Jewish-American lawyer from Pittsburgh, Pennsylvania.

== Life ==
Weil was born on July 19, 1858, in Keysville, Virginia, the son of Bavarian immigrants Isaac L. and Minnia Weil. He moved with his family to Titusville, Pennsylvania, in 1869.

Weil began attending the University of Virginia in 1876 and graduated from there in 1879. He was admitted to the Virginia bar later that year, and by 1880 he was also admitted to the Ohio and Pennsylvania bar. He then began practicing law in Bradford, Pennsylvania, in 1880. In 1888, he moved to Pittsburgh, where he became the legal representative of large interests and made a specialty of corporation law. By 1916, he was senior member of the law firm Weil & Thorp, and by 1931 he was senior member of the law firm Weil, Christy & Weil with his two sons. He made a number of connections with oil and gas operators shortly after arriving in Pittsburgh, and over the years became involved in a number of leading cases related to the production and transportation of petroleum and natural gas. He was involved in one case before the United States Supreme Court related to a state's right to prohibit transportation of its own gas product beyond its own boundaries.

Weil was a member of the Voters' League of Pittsburgh for many years and became its president in 1905. Seeing to combat corruption in office and establish honest government, he directed the Voters' League to oppose the regime of bribery and mismanagement of public affairs rife in the city at the time. His crusade led to 98 members of the select and common councils being indicted for malfeasance along with several bankers, merchants, and other businessmen. The League then helped amend the city charter to replace the former councils of 150 members from the wards with a new body of nine members elected at large. His efforts also led to investigations of the city school boards, which consisted of numerous directors elected by the school districts, and the investigations culminated in the school system being reorganized to consist of a board of directors of schools who were appointed by the judges of the court common pleas. His civic reform record led him to consult reform organizations in other cities, deliver lectures to members of those reform organizations, and help organize reform movements in other states. He was an executive committee member of the National Municipal League and a member of the Pennsylvania Civil Service Association.

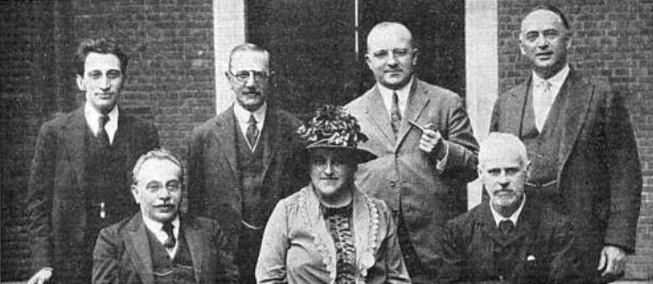
Weil (back row, second from left) at the World Union for Progressive Judaism in 1926

An active participant in Jewish life, Weil was a board member and vice-president of Rodef Shalom Congregation, an incorporator and executive committee member of the American Jewish Committee, a trustee of the Jewish Publication Society of America, vice-president of the World Union for Progressive Judaism and the Union of American Hebrew Congregations, and an executive committee member of the Federated Jewish Philanthropies of Pittsburgh. He was also a member of the American Bar Association, the Pennsylvania Bar Association, the Pittsburgh Athletic Association, the Congressional Country Club, the City Club of New York, the Concordia Club, and the Westmoreland Country Club. In 1883, he married Cassie Ritter of Youngstown, Ohio. Their children were Aimee Leonia (wife of Julian H. Stern of Milwaukee, Wisconsin), Ferdinand T., and A. Leo Jr.

Weil died at home from pneumonia on September 17, 1938. His funeral was held at his residence in the Schenley Apartments. Rabbi Solomon Freehof of Rodef Shalom Congregation officiated the funeral service. He was buried in West View Cemetery.
