= JJ Bleday =

American baseball player (born 1997)

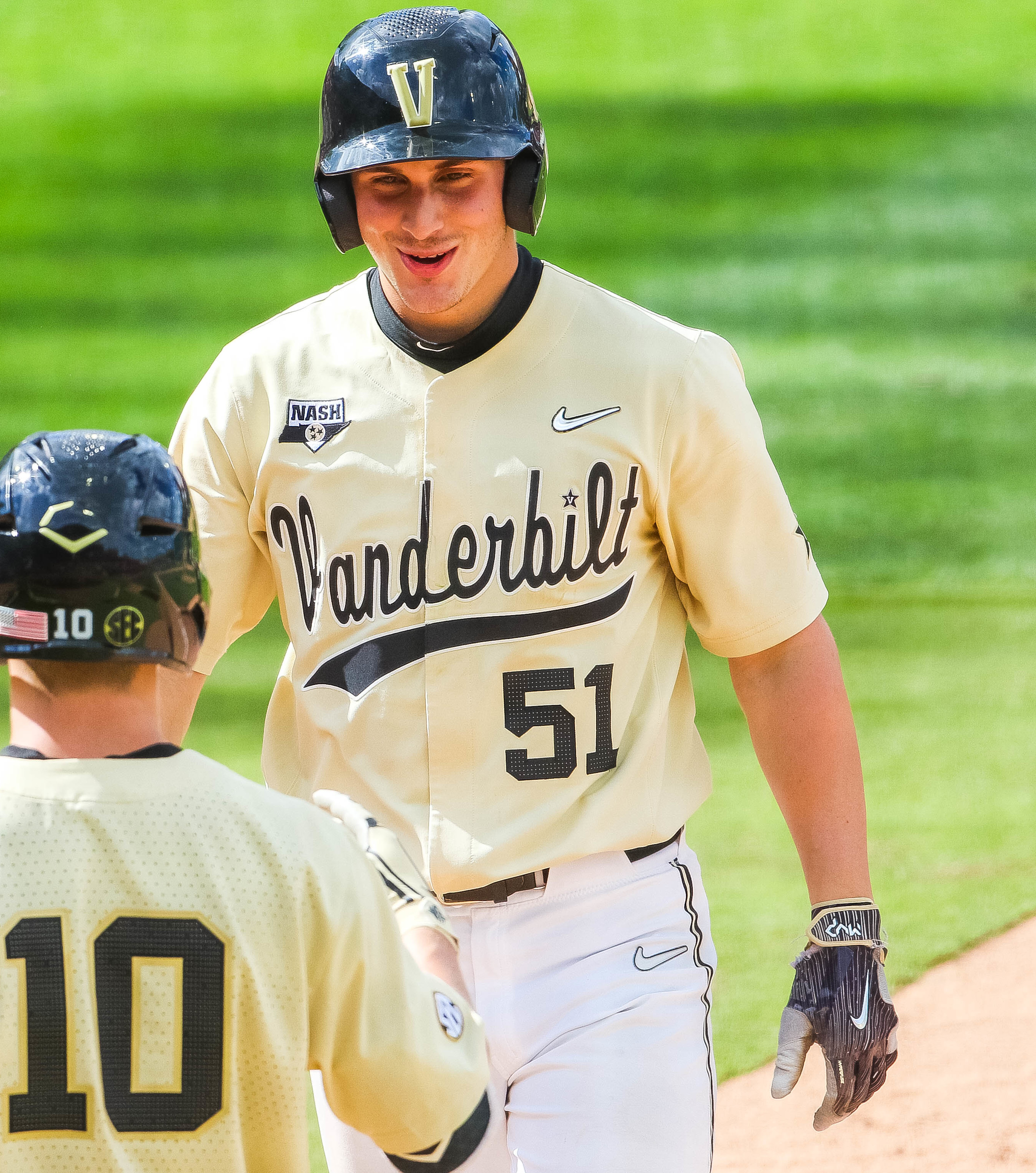
- Bleday with the Vanderbilt Commodores in 2019

Cincinnati Reds – No. 22
- Outfielder
- Born: November 10, 1997 (age 29); Danville, Pennsylvania, U.S.
- Bats: Left Throws: Left

MLB debut
- July 23, 2022, for the Miami Marlins

MLB statistics (through 2026 season)
- Batting average: .216
- Home runs: 73
- Runs batted in: 200
- Stats at Baseball Reference

Teams
- Miami Marlins (2022); Oakland Athletics / Athletics (2023–2025); Cincinnati Reds (2026–present)

Jeffrey Joseph Bleday (born November 10, 1997) is an American professional baseball outfielder for the Cincinnati Reds of Major League Baseball (MLB). He has previously played in MLB for the Miami Marlins and Oakland Athletics / Athletics.

The Marlins selected Bleday with the fourth overall pick of the 2019 MLB draft. He made his MLB debut in 2022 with the Marlins and was traded to Oakland before the 2023 season. Prior to the 2026 season, he signed with Cincinnati.

== Amateur career ==
Bleday grew up in Titusville, Pennsylvania, and attended Titusville Area High School as a freshman and sophomore before transferring to A. Crawford Mosley High School in Lynn Haven, Florida for his junior and senior years. As a junior, he batted .373 while pitching to a 4–1 record and 2.43 earned run average. After his senior year, Bleday was drafted by the San Diego Padres in the 39th round of the 2016 Major League Baseball draft. However, he did not sign and instead chose to attend Vanderbilt University to play college baseball for the Vanderbilt Commodores.

In 2017, as a freshman at Vanderbilt, Bleday appeared in 51 games in which he hit .256 with two home runs and 22 runs batted in (RBIs). That summer, he played for the Newport Gulls of the New England Collegiate Baseball League where he batted .232 with two home runs over 69 at-bats. As a sophomore in 2018, Bleday missed 22 games due to an oblique injury but still appeared in 39 games for the Commodores, batting .368 with four home runs and 15 RBIs. Following the collegiate season, he played in the Cape Cod Baseball League and was named a league all-star and the top professional prospect after hitting .311 with five home runs and 15 RBIs in during 36 games for the Orleans Firebirds. In 2019, Bleday's junior year, he was named the Southeastern Conference Baseball Player of the Year. He finished the season slashing .347/.465/.701 with 27 home runs and 72 RBIs during 71 games, helping Vanderbilt win the 2019 NCAA Division I baseball tournament.

== Professional career ==
=== Miami Marlins ===
Bleday was considered one of the top prospects for the 2019 Major League Baseball draft. He was selected by the Miami Marlins with the fourth overall pick and signed for $6.7 million. He made his professional debut on July 20, 2019, with the High-A Jupiter Hammerheads of the Florida State League and spent the whole season there. Over 38 games, Bleday slashed .257/.311/.379 with three home runs and 19 RBIs.

Bleday did not play a minor league game in 2020 due to the cancellation of the minor league season caused by the COVID-19 pandemic. For the 2021 season, he was assigned to the Pensacola Blue Wahoos of the Double-A South. Over 110 games, he slashed .212/.323/.373 with 12 home runs, 54 RBIs, 22 doubles, and 101 strikeouts. He walked 64 times during the season which was second in the league. He was selected to play in the Arizona Fall League (AFL) for the Mesa Solar Sox after the season where he was named to the Fall Stars Game and was named the game's MVP. Bleday ended the AFL with a .316/.435/.600 slash line over 25 games and was named the league's Hitter of the Year alongside Juan Yepez. Prior to the 2022 season, Bleday gained 20 pounds (9.1 kg) of muscle. He was assigned to the Jacksonville Jumbo Shrimp of the Triple-A International League to begin the year.

On July 23, 2022, the Marlins selected Bleday's contract and promoted him to the major leagues. He made his major league debut as a pinch-hitter that night at PNC Park versus the Pittsburgh Pirates, drawing a walk in his only plate appearance of the night. He recorded his first major league hit the next night with an infield single off of Mitch Keller. On July 27, Bleday hit his first career home run, a solo shot off of Cincinnati Reds starter Luis Castillo. He would play in 65 games for Miami in 2022, hitting .167/.277/.309 with five home runs and 16 RBIs.

=== Oakland Athletics / Athletics ===
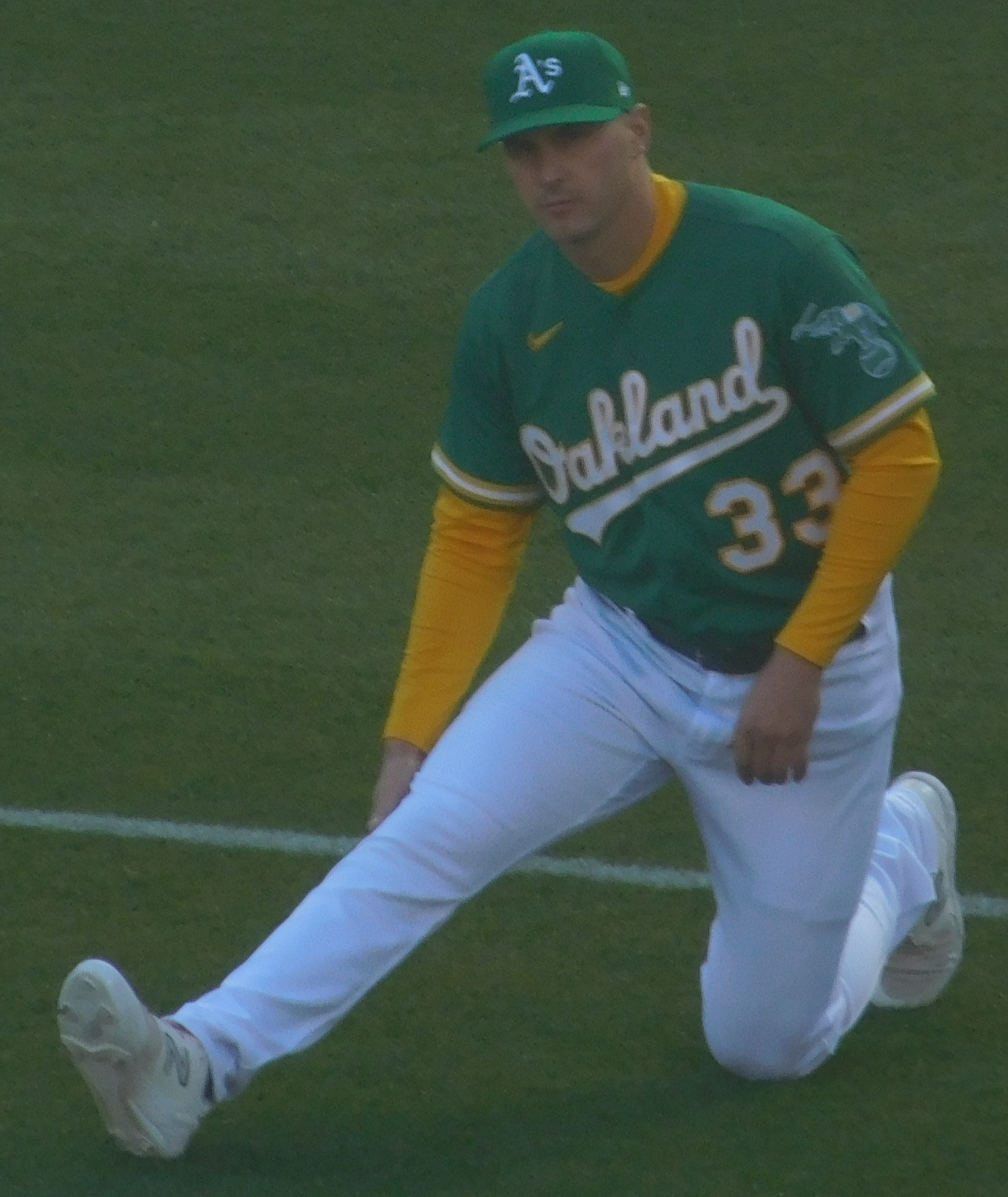
Bleday with the Athletics in May 2023

On February 11, 2023, the Marlins traded Bleday to the Oakland Athletics in exchange for A. J. Puk. Bleday was optioned to the Triple-A Las Vegas Aviators to begin the 2023 season. The Athletics promoted him to the major leagues on May 3. On August 15, Bleday was placed on the injured list; following an MRI, he was diagnosed with an anterior cruciate ligament sprain. In 82 games in 2023, Bleday hit .195/.310/.355 with 10 home runs and 27 RBI.

In 2024, Bleday became the Athletics' everyday center fielder, appearing in 159 games, hitting .243/.324/.437 with 20 home runs and 60 RBI while leading the league in putouts in center field.

Bleday got the opening day start in center field for a second consecutive season in 2025. On June 30, 2025, Bleday was optioned to the Triple-A Las Vegas Aviators. On August 2, the Athletics recalled Bleday to the major leagues. In 98 total appearances for the team, he batted .212/.294/.404 with 14 home runs and 39 RBI. Bleday was designated for assignment by the Athletics on November 18. On November 21, he was non-tendered and became a free agent.

=== Cincinnati Reds ===
On December 27, 2025, the Cincinnati Reds signed Bleday to a one-year, $1.4 million contract. Bleday was optioned to the Triple-A Louisville Bats to begin the 2026 season. Bleday was recalled from the Bats on April 25. He won National League Player of the Month in May, after hitting .301 with eight home runs, 25 RBI, and a 1.018 OPS. On August 22, Bleday hit for the cycle; he became the first Reds player to do so since teammate Elly De La Cruz did so in 2023. Bleday played in 133 games for the Reds and batted .217 with 24 home runs and 58 RBI.

Awards
Preceded by Ildemaro Vargas	National League Player of the Month; May 2026	Succeeded by Pete Crow-Armstrong
Achievements
Preceded by Tristan Peters	Hitting for the cycle August 22, 2026	Succeeded by most recent
