= Titusville Area School District =

School district in Pennsylvania

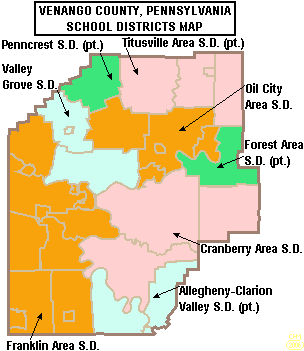

Address
- 301 E Spruce St Titusville, Pennsylvania 16354; United States

District information
- Grades: PK–12
- Established: 1969
- Schools: 6
- NCES District ID: 4223490

Students and staff
- Students: 1,877
- Teachers: 149.30 (on an FTE basis)
- Student–teacher ratio: 12.57
- District mascot: Rockets

Other information
- Website: gorockets.org

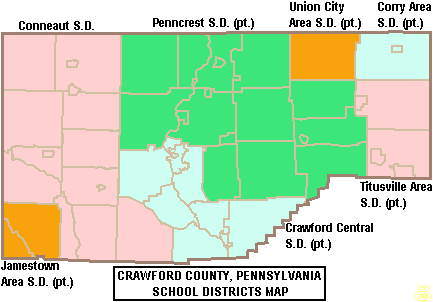
Titusville Area School District region in Crawford County

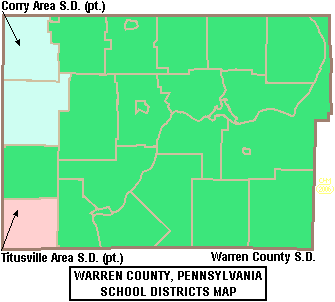
Titusville Area School District region in Warren County

The Titusville Area School District is a small, rural public school district located in Titusville, Pennsylvania.

The school district comprises Allegheny Township, Cherrytree Township, Oil Creek Township and Pleasantville Borough located in Venango County; and Centerville Borough, Hydetown Borough, Oil Creek Township, Rome Township and Titusville City located in Crawford County; and Southwest Township located in Warren County. The School District covers about 200 sq mi (520 km^{2}). Per the 2000 federal census data, the district serves a resident population of 14,698. In 2009, the district residents' per capita income was $15,872, while the median family income was $37,271.

== Schools ==
The district operates an early childhood center, which contains a day care center, three elementary schools (grades 1–5), a middle school (grades 6–8), a senior high school (grades 9–12), and one alternative education school. All of the district's facilities have been either constructed or renovated since the 1990s.

- Early Childhood Center: located at 330 Spruce Street in Titusville. Constructed in 1991, the two-story building is home to Day Care, an Early Intervention Program, Pre-K, Pre-1st and Kindergarten Classes for the entire district.
- Main Street Elementary School: opened in 1912 and was renovated in 2002. The school is located at 117 Main Street, Titusville, PA.
- Hydetown Elementary School: opened in 1956 and was renovated in 2001. The school is located at 12294 Gresham Road, Titusville, PA.
- Pleasantville Elementary School: opened in 1942 and was a High School, until the building was merged into the district in 1969. All district Junior High School Students attended at the school until 1977 when the Senior High School was renovated, after that it became solely an elementary school. The school is located at 374 North Main Street, Pleasantville, PA.
- Titusville Area Middle School: opened in 1999, after moving from the High School Complex. The school is located at 415 Water Street, Titusville, PA.
- Titusville Area High School: located at 302 E. Walnut St., Titusville, PA.
