= Joseph Bushnell Ames =

American novelist

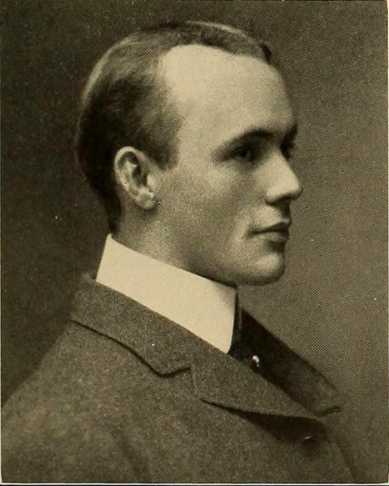
- Born: August 9, 1878; Titusville, Pennsylvania
- Died: June 20, 1928 (aged 49); Morristown, New Jersey
- Education: Stevens Institute of Technology
- Occupation: Novelist
- Relatives: Peter Ashmun Ames (brother); Daniel Bushnell (great-grandfather)

Joseph Bushnell Ames (August 9, 1878 – June 20, 1928) was an American novelist during the early 20th century.

== Early life ==
Joseph Bushnell Ames was born on August 9, 1878, in Titusville, Pennsylvania, the son of Elias Hurlbut Ames (1851–1891) and Eleanor Gray Bushnell (1855–1946). Both Ames' father and maternal grandfather, Joseph Bushnell (1831–1918), came from old New England families and became wealthy during the Pennsylvania Oil Rush. Ames' great-grandfather was the Pittsburgh industrialist Daniel Bushnell. After Elias Ames' death of pneumonia in 1891 at age 39, Joseph's mother moved the family to Morristown, New Jersey, where her children had a privileged upbringing in the town that was then known as an "inland Newport.". Ames attended St. Mark's School and the Stevens Institute of Technology, graduating from the latter in 1901. Ames then worked as a mechanical engineer in Morristown, New Jersey for a time, until he quit that profession and began writing.

== Career ==
Ames wrote over a dozen novels, primarily Westerns, during the 1910s and 1920s. Some of his works, including the posthumously published The Bladed Barrier, included fantasy themes. While Ames' books were set in the Western United States (the famous Pete, cow-puncher - A Story of the Texas Plains, is one example), it is unclear whether he ever travelled there extensively. His novel Shoe-Bar Stratton was made into the 1922 Western film Catch My Smoke, directed by William Beaudine and featuring actors Tom Mix and Lillian Rich.

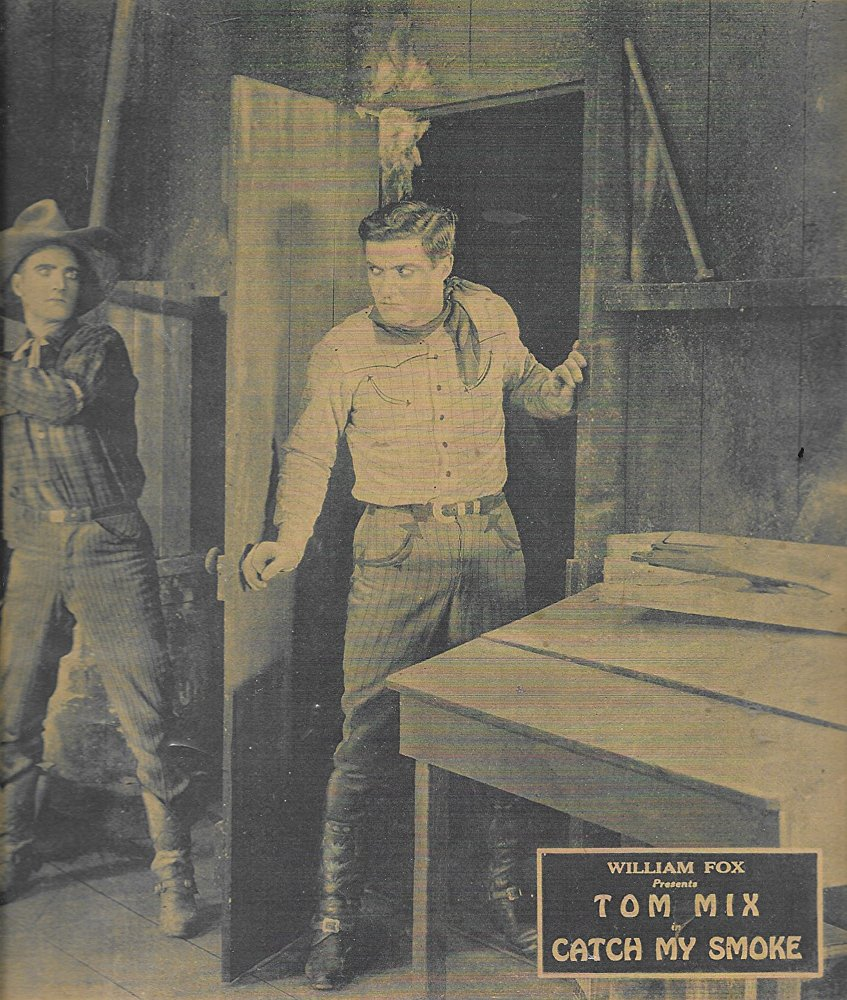
Poster for the 1922 film Catch My Smoke, based on Ames' novel "Shoe-bar Stratton"

== Personal life ==
For most of his writing career Ames lived in "Willow Hall," a mansion on his estate, "Speedwell," in Morristown, New Jersey. The estate was the former residence of industrialist George Vail. Today the home is preserved as a historic site. Ames' brother Peter Ashmun Ames, to whom Joseph dedicated his 1921 novel The Emerald Buddha, was an American who served in the British Army in the Grenadier Guards during World War I and then as a British military intelligence spymaster and a member of the Cairo Gang, until Bloody Sunday, when Lt. Ames was assassinated in Dublin by order of Michael Collins during the Irish War of Independence. The philanthropist Mary Warden Harkness, wife of Charles W. Harkness, was a first cousin of Ames' mother Eleanor.

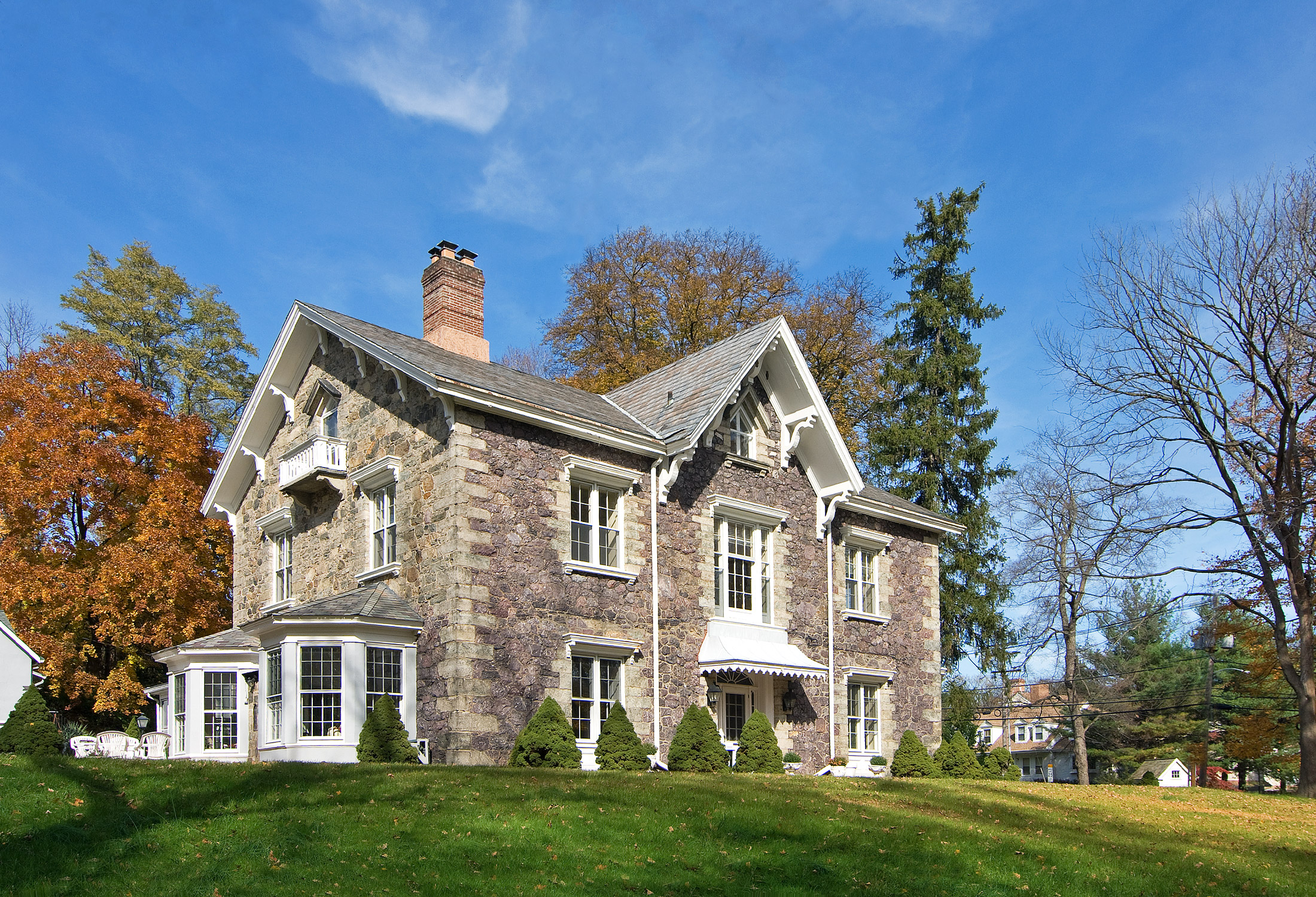
Ames' home in Morristown, New Jersey, as it appears today.

== Books ==
- The Valley of Missing Men. London: A.C. McClurg & Company, 1925.
- The Man from Painted Post. New York: Century Company, 1923.
- The Stranger from Cheyenne. New York: Century Company, 1927.
- The Mystery of Ram Island. New York: Century Company, 1918.
- Chaps and Chukkers. New York: Century Company, 1928.
- The Bladed Barrier. New York, London: The Century Co., 1929.
- The Secret of Spirit Lake. New York: Century Company, 1927.
- The Emerald Buddha. Boston: Small, Maynard & Company, 1921.
- Flame of the Desert. New York: Duffield, 1928.
- Curly and the Aztec Gold. New York: Century Company, 1920.
- Shoe-Bar Stratton. New York: Century Company, 1922.
- Pete, Cow-puncher: A Story of the Texas Plains. New York: Grosset & Dunlap, 1908.
- Under Boy Scout Colors. New York: Grosset & Dunlap, 1917.
- The Lone Hand. New York: A. L. Burt Company, 1926.
