= Axtell J. Byles =

American football player and coach (1880–1941)

Biographical details
- Born: October 1, 1880; Titusville, Pennsylvania, U.S.
- Died: September 28, 1941 (aged 60); Ardsley-on-Hudson, New York, U.S.

Playing career

Football
- 1902: Princeton
- Position: Fullback

Coaching career (HC unless noted)

Football
- 1903: Washington and Lee

Head coaching record
- Overall: 4–1

Axtell Julius Byles (October 1, 1880 – September 28, 1941) was an American college football player and coach, lawyer, and oil business executive. He served as the co-head football coach at Washington and Lee University in Lexington, Virginia with D. M. Balliet in 1903, compiling a record of 4–1. Byles played football at Princeton University as a fullback.

Byles attended the University of Pittsburgh School of Law, and was admitted to the Pennsylvania bar in 1905. He practiced law his hometown, Titusville, Pennsylvania, from 1905 to 1917. Byles was hired as general counsel of the Tide Water Oil Company in 1917. He later served as director, vice president, and president of the company. In 1926, the Tide Water Oil Company and the Associated Oil Company became subsidiaries of the new Tide Water Associated Oil Company, and Byles became president of the consolidated firm. From 1933 until his death, he was the president of the American Petroleum Institute. Byles died on September 28, 1941.

== Head coaching record ==
Year	Team	Overall	Conference	Standing	Bowl/playoffs
Washington and Lee Generals (Independent) (1902)
1902	Washington and Lee	4–1			
Washington and Lee:		4–1			
Total:		4–1			
