= Leal Mack =

American painter (1892–1962)

- Born: April 1892; Titusville, Pennsylvania, U.S.
- Died: June 1, 1962 (aged 70); Taos, New Mexico, U.S.
- Education: Pennsylvania Academy of the Fine Arts
- Occupations: Illustrator, painter

Leal Mack (April 1892 – June 1, 1962) was an American magazine illustrator and painter. He began his career as an illustrator for publications like The Saturday Evening Post, The Country Gentleman, and Redbook. He relocated to Taos, New Mexico in 1944, where his paintings depicted scenes of the Old West.
