= Jonathan Titus =

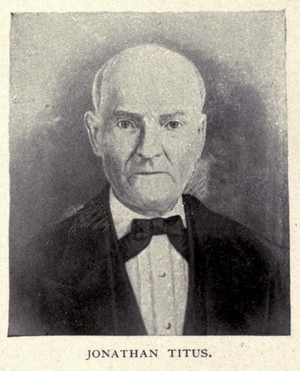
Jonathan Titus

Jonathan Titus (May 27, 1772 – 1857) is considered to be the founder of Titusville, Pennsylvania, United States.

Jonathan Titus was born near Frankstown in Blair County, Pennsylvania. The area surrounding the Oil Creek Valley, now known as Titusville, Pennsylvania, was first settled by white Americans in 1797 by Jonathan Titus and his uncle Samuel Kerr, who were involved in the early planning of the community. Plans for a community were created and Titusville soon became established. Several families moved to the area as westward expansion of the United States was becoming more common. Jonathan married Mary Martin and raised a family in the early years of Titusville. He died in 1857.
