= Catch My Smoke =

1922 film

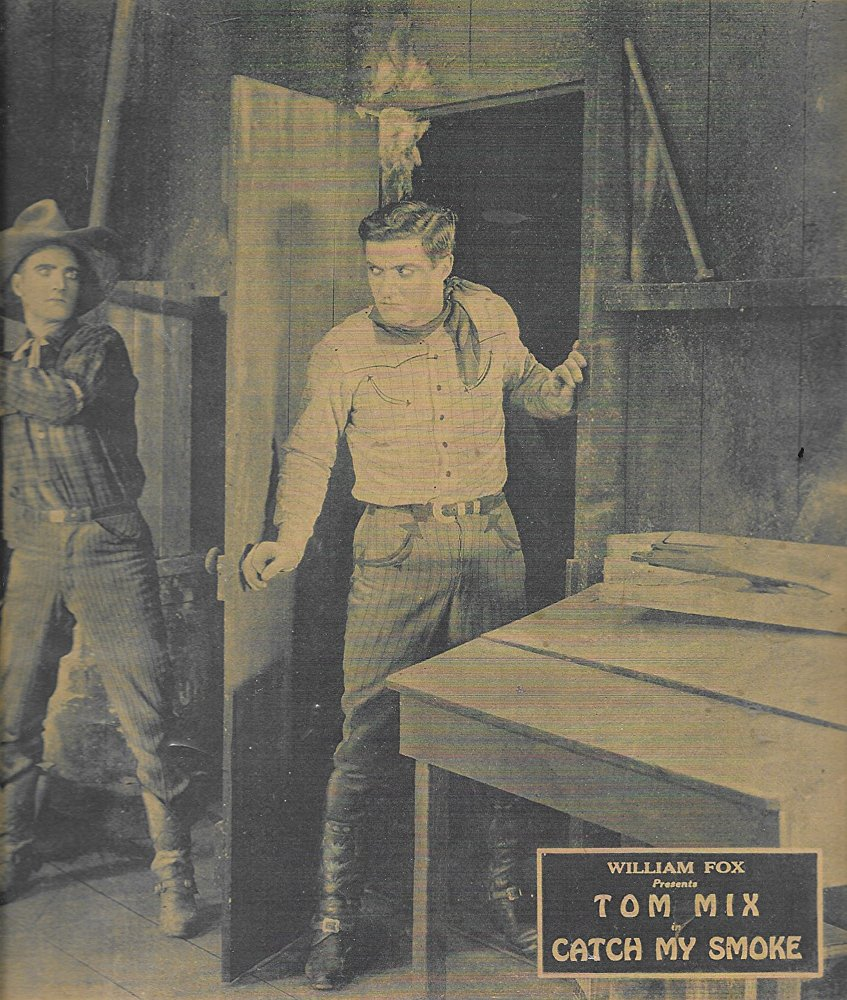
- Poster
- Directed by: William Beaudine
- Written by: John Stone
- Based on: Shoe Bar Stratton by Joseph Bushnell Ames
- Produced by: William Fox
- Cinematography: Daniel B. Clark
- Distributed by: Fox Film Corporation
- Release date: December 31, 1922
- Running time: 5 reels
- Country: United States
- Languages: Silent; English intertitles

Catch My Smoke is a 1922 American silent Western film directed by William Beaudine, based on the novel Shoe-bar Stratton by Joseph Bushnell Ames. It stars Tom Mix, Lillian Rich, and Claude Payton.

== Plot ==
As described in a film magazine, Bob Stratton returns from France after two years and finds his ranch in strange hands. In order to get to the bottom of affairs, he takes a job there. Mary Thorne is running the ranch, left to her by her father who was the executor of Bob's will and, thinking Bob had been killed in World War I, had appropriated the place for himself. Mary's father had been mysteriously killed, and she has engaged Tex Lynch as her foreman. Tex knows the ranch has oil under it and tries to force Mary to sell it. She is captured and taken to a deserted mine, but Bob arrives on scene to affect a rescue. Together they ride back together and Bob's horse Tony approves of their match.

== Cast ==
- Tom Mix as Bob Stratton
- Lillian Rich as Mary Thorne
- Claude Payton as Tex Lynch
- Gordon Griffith as Bub Jessup
- Harry Griffith as Al Draper
- Robert Milasch as Frank Hurd
- Pat Chrisman as Joe Bloss
- C.E. Anderson as Sheriff
- Ruby Lafayette as Mrs Archer
- Tony the Horse (uncredited)

== Status ==
The film's status is unknown, meaning that it may be lost.

== See also ==
- Tom Mix filmography
