= Frederick Marathon =

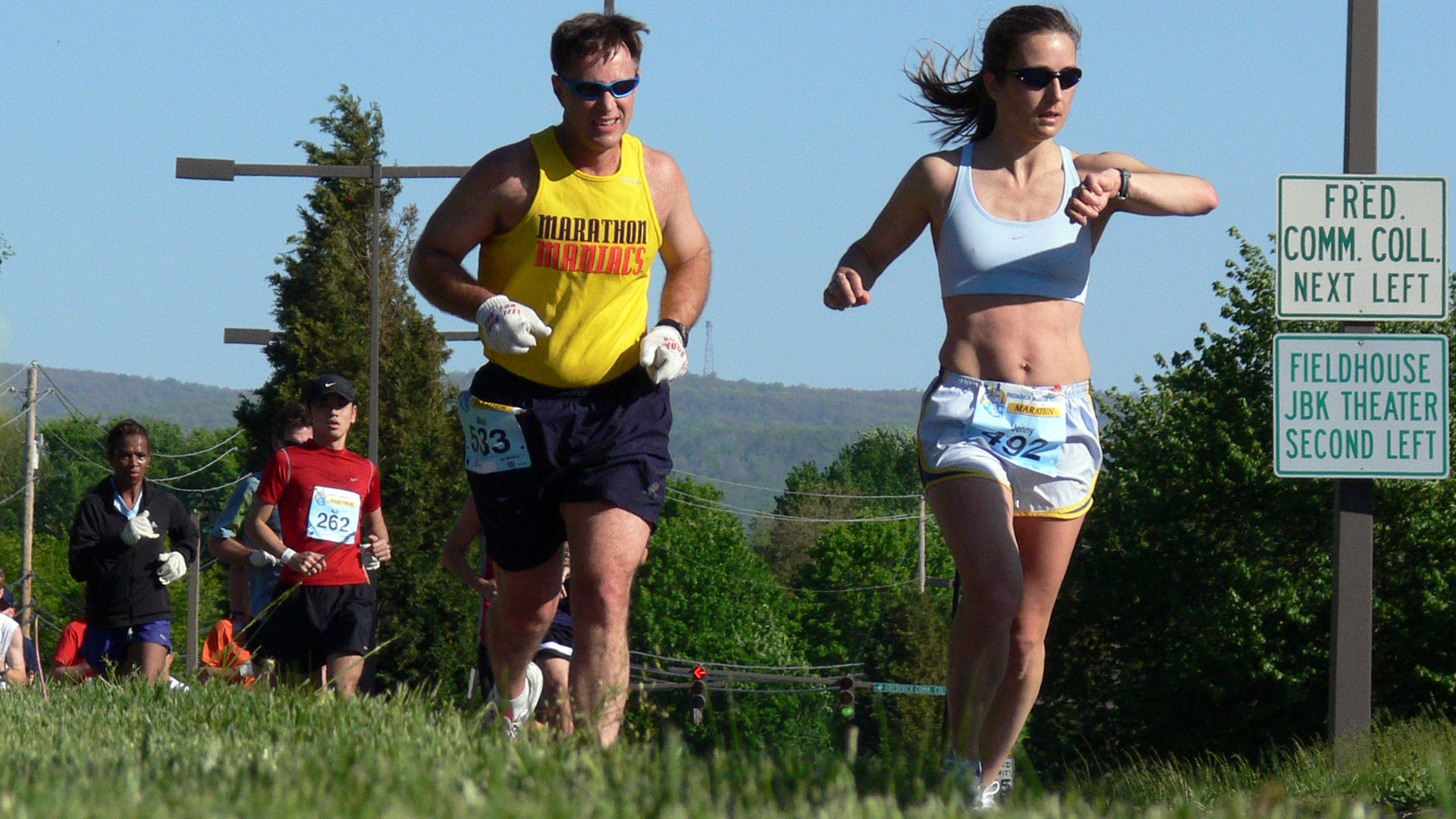
- Runners passing Frederick Community College during the 2007 Frederick Marathon
- Date: Early May
- Location: Frederick, Maryland
- Event type: road
- Distance: Marathon
- Established: 2003
- Course records: 2:26:44(M) 2:53:44(F)
- Website: www.frederickmarathon.org

The Frederick Marathon was the flagship race of several races held in Frederick, Maryland known collectively as the Frederick Running Festival.

== History ==
The 7th annual marathon took place on May 2, 2010, and 706 participants finished. Carefirst (the mid-atlantic organization of the Blue Cross and Blue Shield Association), sponsored the event.

In the 2010 race, Morton Caster of Westminster, Maryland won the men's race with a time of 2:44:57, while Becki Pierotti of Hazleton, Pennsylvania won the woman's race with a time of 3:14:49.

A notable result in the marathon's history is Michael Wardian's breaking the then world record for fastest marathon while pushing a baby stroller. Wardian accomplished this in 2007 with a time of 2:42:21. Wardian also owns the men's record for the race, with a 2:26:44 finish in 2006.

Other races that take place are a half-marathon, team relay race, 5K run, and kids fun run.

It was announced in October 2010 that the marathon was discontinued. The safety of marathon runners was cited as a primary factor. The Running Festival will continue, with a focus on the half marathon.

== Winners ==
=== Men's Half Marathon ===
- 2024 Dan Jacobs, 1:09:24
- 2023 Robert Creese, 1:09:13
- 2022 Dan Jacobs, 1:11:59
- 2021 Chris Sloane 1:11:46
- 2020 Alex Danna 1:29:29 (virtual)

=== Men's Marathon ===
- 2010 Morton Caster, 2:44:56
- 2009 Dickson Mercer, 2:37:03
- 2008 Brian Baillie, 2:34:49
- 2007 Christopher Zieman, 2:27:15
- 2006 Michael Wardian, 2:26:44 (Record)
- 2005 Michael Wardian, 2:29:13
- 2004 Jaime Dick, 2:50:08
- 2003 Maurits Van Der Veen, 2:37:11

=== Women's Half Marathon ===
- 2024 Andrea Dodson, 1:21:59
- 2023 Claire Heasman, 1:23:41
- 2022 Meaghan Murray, 1:21:09
- 2021 Cindy Anderson
- 2020 Eliza Mummert 1:34:31 (virtual)

=== Women's Marathon ===
- 2010 Becki Pierotti, 3:14:49:
- 2009 Denise Knickman, 3:02:20
- 2008 Melissa Tanner, 2:56:17
- 2007 Jenn Shelton, 2:53:44 (Record)
- 2006 Kristin Van Eron, 2:57:19
- 2005 Susan Graham-Gray, 2:56:58
- 2004 Susan Graham-Gray, 3:05:50
- 2003 Becki McClintock, 3:28:25
