= Titusville, Pennsylvania =

City in Pennsylvania, US

- City
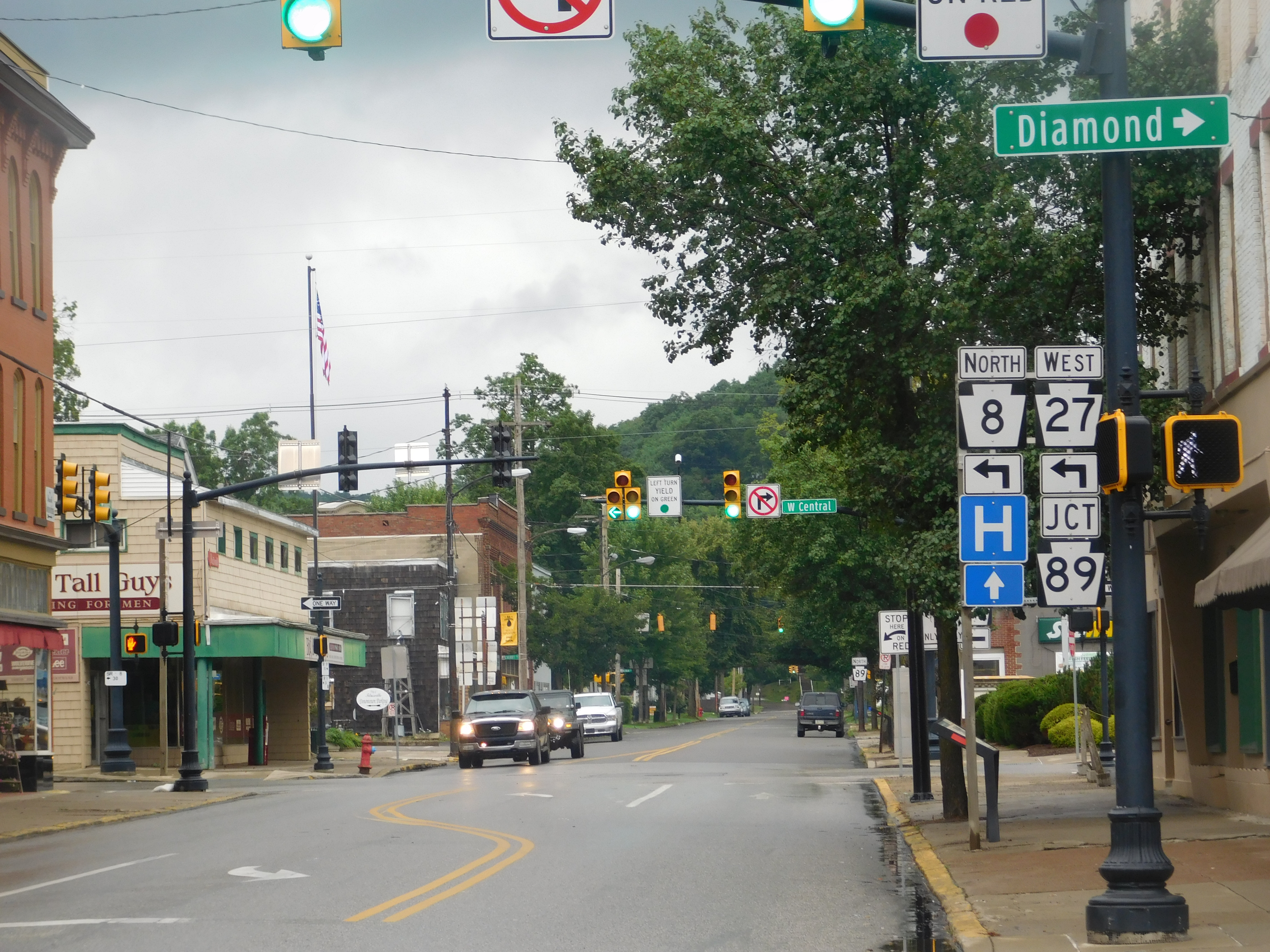
- Titusville in August 2016

- Flag Seal
- Etymology: Jonathan Titus
- Nickname: The Queen City
- Motto: The Valley That Changed the World
- Location of Titusville in Crawford County, Pennsylvania

- Location in Pennsylvania Location in the United States
- Coordinates: 41°37′37″N 79°40′34″W
- Country: United States
- State: Pennsylvania
- County: Crawford
- Incorporated (city): February 28, 1866
- Founder: Jonathan Titus
- Region government/seat: Council–manager

Government
  - Mayor: John W Frye (R)

Area
  - Total: 2.90 sq mi (7.51 km^{2})
  - Land: 2.90 sq mi (7.51 km^{2})
  - Water: 0 sq mi (0.00 km^{2})
- Elevation (middle of city): 1,200 ft (370 m)
- Highest elevation (northeast corner of city): 1,621 ft (494 m)
- Lowest elevation (Oil Creek): 1,150 ft (350 m)

Population (2020)
  - Total: 5,262
  - Density: 1,778.3/sq mi (686.62/km^{2})
- Time zone: UTC-4 (EST)
  - Summer (DST): UTC-5 (EDT)
- ZIP Code: 16354
- Area code: 814
- FIPS code: 42-76904
- Website: www.cityoftitusvillepa.gov

Titusville is a city in the far eastern corner of Crawford County, Pennsylvania, United States. The population was 5,262 at the 2020 census. Titusville is known as the birthplace of the American oil industry and for a number of years was the leading oil-producing region in the world. It was also notable for its lumber industry, including 17 sawmills, as well as its plastic and toolmaking industries. It is part of the Meadville micropolitan area.

== History ==
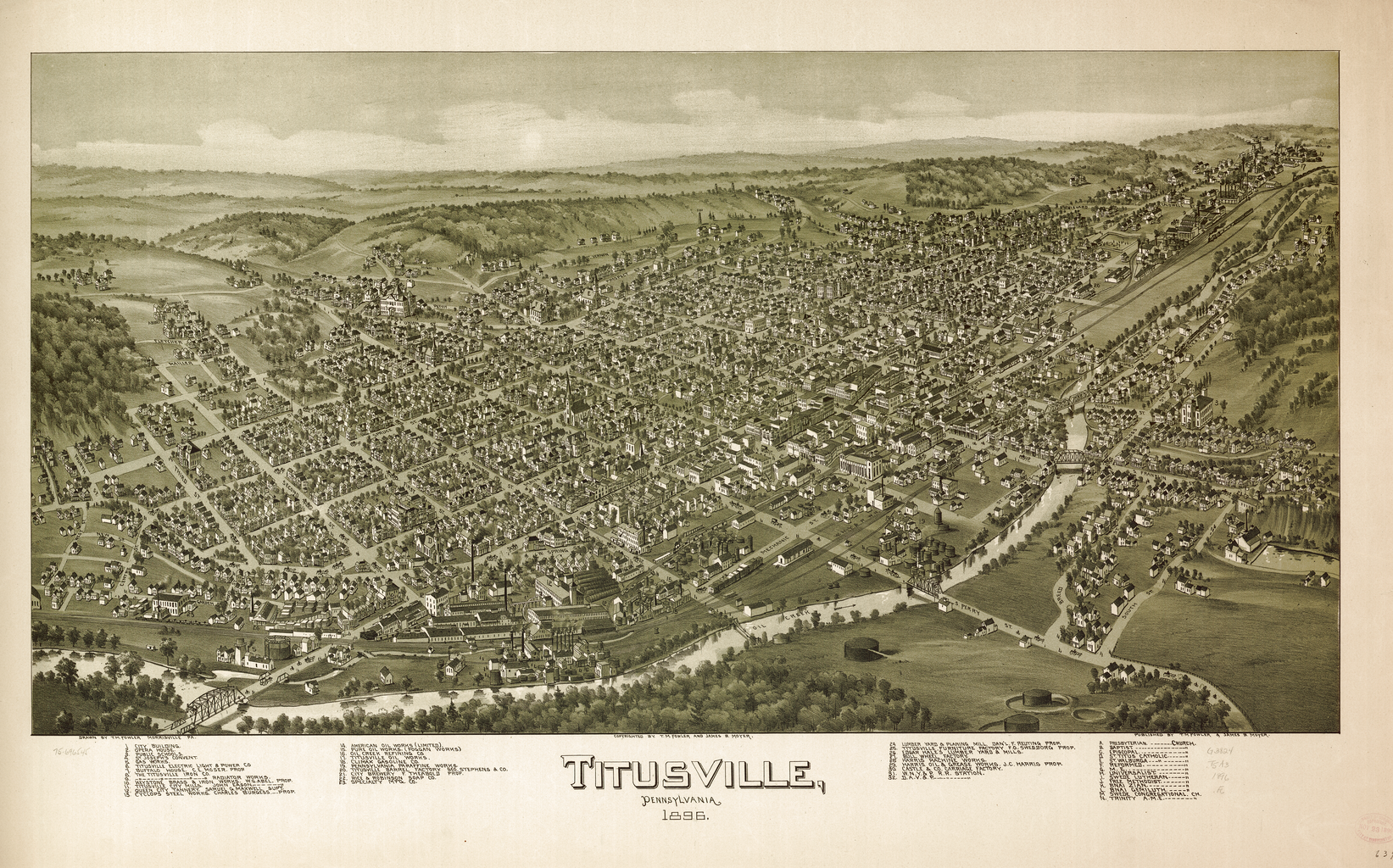
Titusville depicted in an 1896 portrait by Thaddeus Mortimer Fowler

The area was first settled in 1796 by Jonathan Titus. Within 14 years, others bought and improved land lying near his, along the banks of what is now Oil Creek. Titus named the village Edinburg(h), but as it grew, the settlers began to call the hamlet Titusville. The village was incorporated as a borough in 1849. It was a slow-growing community until the 1850s, when petroleum was discovered in the region.

Oil was known to exist there, but there was no practical way to extract it. Its main use at that time had been as a medicine for both animals and humans. In the late 1850s, the Seneca Oil Company (formerly the Pennsylvania Rock Oil Company) sent Col. Edwin L. Drake to start drilling on a piece of leased land just south of Titusville, near what is now Oil Creek State Park. In the summer of 1859, Drake hired a salt well driller, William A. Smith. They had many difficulties, but on August 27, at the site of an oil spring just south of Titusville, they finally drilled a well that could be commercially successful.

Teamsters were needed immediately to transport the oil to markets. In 1862, the Oil Creek & Titusville Railroad was built between Titusville and Corry, where the product was transferred to larger east-west railroad lines. In 1865, pipelines were laid directly to the line and the demand for teamsters practically ended. The next year the railroad line was extended south to Petroleum Centre and Oil City. The Union & Titusville Railroad was built in 1865. That line became part of the Philadelphia and Erie Railroad in 1871. That fall, President Ulysses S. Grant visited Titusville to view the important region.

Other oil-related businesses were quickly established. Eight refineries were built between 1862 and 1868. Drilling tools were needed and several iron works were built. Titusville grew from 250 residents to 10,000 almost overnight and in 1866, it incorporated as a city. In 1871, the first oil exchange in the United States was established there. The exchange moved from the city, but returned in 1881 in a new, brick building, before being dissolved in 1897.

The first oil millionaire was Jonathan Watson, a resident of Titusville. He owned the land where Drake's well was drilled. He had been a partner in a lumber business prior to the success of the well. At one time it was said that Titusville had more millionaires per capita than anywhere else in the world.

One resident of note was Franklin S. Tarbell, whose large Italianate home still stands. He first moved a few miles south in Venango County and established a wooden stock tank business. About 10 miles (16 km) south-east of Titusville was another oil boom city, Pithole. Oil was discovered in a rolling meadow there in January 1865 and, by September 1865, the population was 15,000. But the oil soon ran dry and within four years the city was nearly deserted. Tarbell moved to Titusville in 1870. His daughter, Ida Minerva Tarbell, grew up amidst the sounds and smells of the oil industry. She became an accomplished writer and published a series of articles about the business practices of the Standard Oil Company and its president, John D. Rockefeller, which sparked legislative action in Congress concerning monopolies.

Fire was always a significant concern around oil and one of the worst blazes was on June 11, 1880. It came to be known as "Black Friday", when almost 300,000 barrels (48,000 m^{3}) of oil burned after an oil tank was hit by lightning. The fire raged for three days until it finally was brought under control. The destroyed oil was valued at $2 million, but there was no loss of life. Another fire occurred on June 5, 1892, when Oil Creek flooded and a tank of petroleum ether overturned. The petroleum ether ignited and, in the ensuing explosions, 60 men, women and children died. Another lightning strike in 1894 resulted in 27,000 barrels (4,300,000 liters) of oil being lost in a fire.

Oil production in Pennsylvania peaked in 1891, after which other industries became established in Titusville. The iron and steel industries dominated the town in the early twentieth century, with lumber eventually reclaiming its former pre-eminence. Oil still has some relevance, however. Charter Plastics, now located in a building that once manufactured pressure vessels, stationary engines and boilers for the oil industry, uses oil in its production processes.

== Geography ==
Titusville is located at 41°38′N 79°40′W (41.629, −79.674).

According to the United States Census Bureau, the city has a total area of 2.9 square miles (7.5 km^{2}), all land.

Located 44.4 miles south of Erie, Pennsylvania

83.6 miles North of Pittsburgh, Pennsylvania

122.9 Miles East of Cleveland, Ohio

120.5 Miles South of Buffalo, New York

78.2 Miles North East of Youngstown, Ohio

=== Climate ===
Climate data for Titusville, Pennsylvania (1991–2020 normals, extremes 1954–present)
Month	Jan	Feb	Mar	Apr	May	Jun	Jul	Aug	Sep	Oct	Nov	Dec	Year
Record high °F (°C)	68 (20)	74 (23)	81 (27)	88 (31)	91 (33)	94 (34)	100 (38)	96 (36)	97 (36)	87 (31)	78 (26)	72 (22)	100 (38)
Mean daily maximum °F (°C)	32.8 (0.4)	35.3 (1.8)	44.0 (6.7)	57.9 (14.4)	69.4 (20.8)	77.3 (25.2)	81.0 (27.2)	79.6 (26.4)	73.4 (23.0)	61.2 (16.2)	48.3 (9.1)	37.2 (2.9)	58.1 (14.5)
Daily mean °F (°C)	23.9 (−4.5)	24.8 (−4.0)	33.1 (0.6)	45.2 (7.3)	56.4 (13.6)	64.9 (18.3)	68.9 (20.5)	67.3 (19.6)	61.0 (16.1)	49.4 (9.7)	38.6 (3.7)	29.2 (−1.6)	46.9 (8.3)
Mean daily minimum °F (°C)	15.0 (−9.4)	14.3 (−9.8)	22.3 (−5.4)	32.5 (0.3)	43.3 (6.3)	52.6 (11.4)	56.7 (13.7)	55.0 (12.8)	48.7 (9.3)	37.6 (3.1)	28.8 (−1.8)	21.3 (−5.9)	35.7 (2.1)
Record low °F (°C)	−31 (−35)	−37 (−38)	−20 (−29)	4 (−16)	17 (−8)	26 (−3)	34 (1)	32 (0)	21 (−6)	11 (−12)	−1 (−18)	−22 (−30)	−37 (−38)
Average precipitation inches (mm)	3.53 (90)	2.70 (69)	3.49 (89)	4.24 (108)	4.05 (103)	4.86 (123)	4.25 (108)	3.58 (91)	4.06 (103)	4.22 (107)	3.63 (92)	3.72 (94)	46.33 (1,177)
Average snowfall inches (cm)	24.3 (62)	18.5 (47)	12.5 (32)	2.8 (7.1)	0.0 (0.0)	0.0 (0.0)	0.0 (0.0)	0.0 (0.0)	0.0 (0.0)	0.8 (2.0)	8.5 (22)	22.0 (56)	89.4 (227)
Average precipitation days (≥ 0.01 in)	18.8	15.0	14.0	14.6	12.9	12.8	11.4	10.6	10.4	14.1	14.4	17.4	166.4
Average snowy days (≥ 0.1 in)	13.9	10.6	6.7	1.7	0.0	0.0	0.0	0.0	0.0	0.4	3.9	10.4	47.6
Source: NOAA

=== Natural features ===
The City of Titusville is located in the southeastern Corner of Crawford County in the Pittsburgh High Plateau. The city is drained by Oil Creek, a south-flowing tributary of the Allegheny River, and two tributaries to Oil Creek, Pine Creek, and Church Run. The lowest elevation in the City of Titusville is 1,150 ft (350 m) where Oil Creek flows south of out of the city. The highest elevation is 1,650 ft (500 m) on a high point at the northeastern corner of the city.

== Demographics ==
Historical population
Census	Pop.	Note	%±
1850	245		—
1860	438		78.8%
1870	8,639		1,872.4%
1880	11,982		38.7%
1890	12,786		6.7%
1900	11,738		−8.2%
1910	9,982		−15.0%
1920	8,432		−15.5%
1930	8,055		−4.5%
1940	8,126		0.9%
1950	8,923		9.8%
1960	8,356		−6.4%
1970	7,331		−12.3%
1980	6,884		−6.1%
1990	6,434		−6.5%
2000	6,146		−4.5%
2010	5,601		−8.9%
2020	5,262		−6.1%

=== 2020 census ===
As of the 2020 census, Titusville had a population of 5,262. The median age was 41.9 years. 22.9% of residents were under the age of 18 and 22.6% of residents were 65 years of age or older. For every 100 females there were 87.5 males, and for every 100 females age 18 and over there were 83.7 males age 18 and over.

98.3% of residents lived in urban areas, while 1.7% lived in rural areas.

There were 2,310 households in Titusville, of which 25.8% had children under the age of 18 living in them. Of all households, 33.5% were married-couple households, 19.9% were households with a male householder and no spouse or partner present, and 37.5% were households with a female householder and no spouse or partner present. About 39.8% of all households were made up of individuals and 21.3% had someone living alone who was 65 years of age or older.

There were 2,588 housing units, of which 10.7% were vacant. The homeowner vacancy rate was 3.4% and the rental vacancy rate was 6.1%.

Racial composition as of the 2020 census
Race	Number	Percent
White	4,836	91.9%
Black or African American	62	1.2%
American Indian and Alaska Native	10	0.2%
Asian	26	0.5%
Native Hawaiian and Other Pacific Islander	2	0.0%
Some other race	39	0.7%
Two or more races	287	5.5%
Hispanic or Latino (of any race)	95	1.8%

=== 2010 census ===
As of the 2010 census, there were 5,418 people, 2,397 households, and 1,337 families residing in the city. The population density was 1,931.2 inhabitants per square mile (745.6/km^{2}). There were 2,876 housing units at an average density of 901.7 per square mile (348.1/km^{2}). The racial makeup of the city was 96.2% White, 1.9% African American, 0.2% Native American, 0.9% Asian, 0.2% from other races, and 1.1% from two or more races. Hispanic or Latino of any race were 1.2% of the population.

There were 2,322 households, out of which 25.4% had children under the age of 18 living with them, 39.2% were married couples living together, 13.9% had a female householder with no husband present, and 42.4% were non-families. 37.4% of all households were made up of individuals, and 19.3% had someone living alone who was 65 years of age or older. The average household size was 2.23 and the average family size was 2.91.

In the city, the population was spread out, with 22.8% under the age of 18, 11.7% from 18 to 24, 22.2% from 25 to 44, 24.5% from 45 to 64, and 19.9% who were 65 years of age or older. The median age was 40.1 years. For every 100 females, there were 84.8 males. For every 100 females age 18 and over, there were 79.0 males.

The median income for a household in the city was $28,978 and the median income for a family was $39,679. Males had a median income of $27,283 versus $20,458 for females. The per capita income for the city was $19,915. About 13.0% of families and 15.9% of the population were below the poverty line, including 17.4% of those under age 18 and 6.7% of those age 65 or over.

== Transportation ==
- Crawford Area Transportation Authority
- Titusville Regional Airport

== Historical markers ==
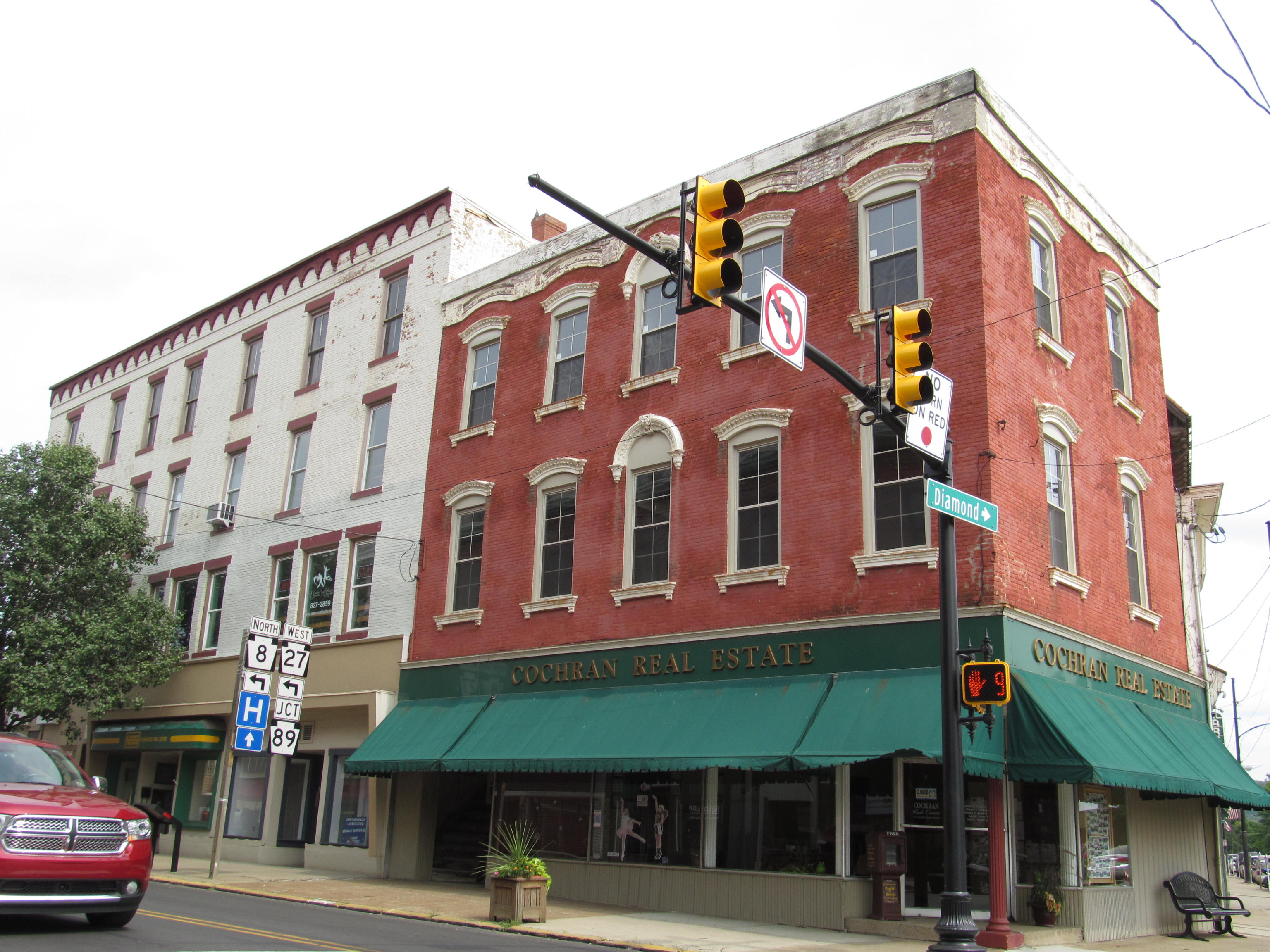
Downtown Titusville, PA in 2014

- Titusville Early Refinery
- Edwin L Drake Tombstone
- The John Heisman Memorial
- Oil Creek State Park
- Titusville Oil Exchange

== Tourism ==
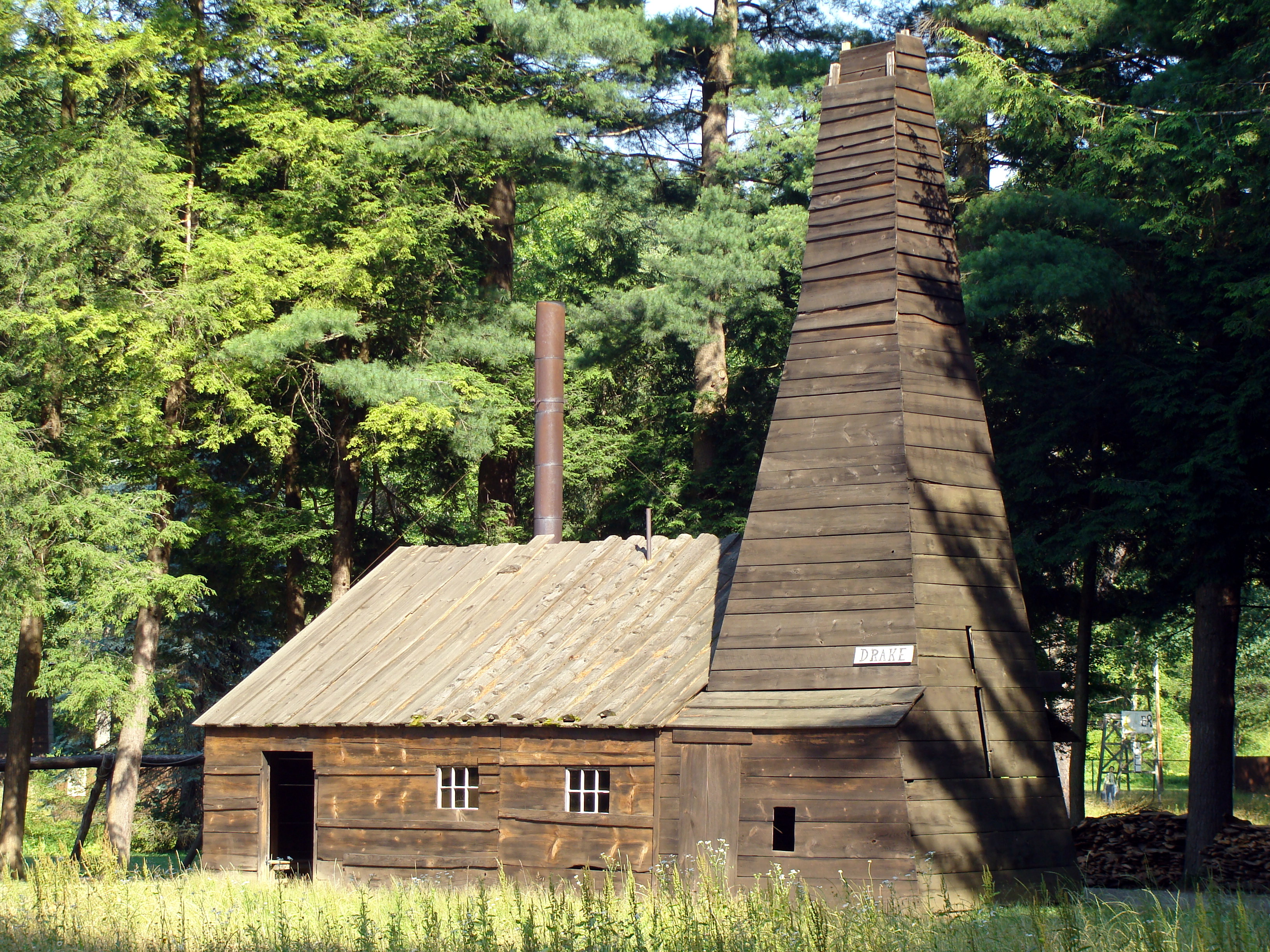
Drake Well

- The Drake Well Museum and Park- A museum that interprets the birth of the American oil industry in 1859 by "Colonel" Edwin Drake along the banks of Oil Creek in Cherrytree Township, Pennsylvania. The museum collects and preserves related artifacts. The reconstructed Drake Well demonstrates the first practical use of salt drilling techniques for the extraction of petroleum through an oil well. A historic site, the museum is located in Cherrytree Township, 2 miles (4.8 km) south of Titusville on Drake Well Road, situated between Pennsylvania Routes 8 and 27. The museum is accredited by the American Alliance of Museums.
- Tarbell House
- Pithole Museum & Visitor Center- Legendary boomtown that was destroyed by a fire
- South Franklin Street Bridge- The Historical Steel Bridge located in the Heart of Titusville
- Benson Memorial Library- A historic Victorian style building
- Oil Creek and Titusville Railroad is a tourist railroad that runs from Titusville to Rynd Farm north of Oil City.
- Titusville Historical Society & Heritage Center
- Titusville City Hall- National Historic Site
- Great Eastern Cutlery- Knife Factory
- Oil Creek Family Campground in Oil Creek State Park
- Benson Memorial Library
- Burgess Park Splash Pad

== Festivals ==
- OilFest- Festival in Titusville largest day time festival in Pennsylvania
- Home for the Holidays- Christmas Activities in December in Titusville
- Heart of the Arts folk and music festival
- Titusville Summer Concert Series

== Education ==
The area is served by the Titusville Area School District which includes Titusville High School, Titusville Middle School, Mainstreet Elementary. Pleasantville Elementary, Hydetown Elementary, ECLC.

=== Universities ===
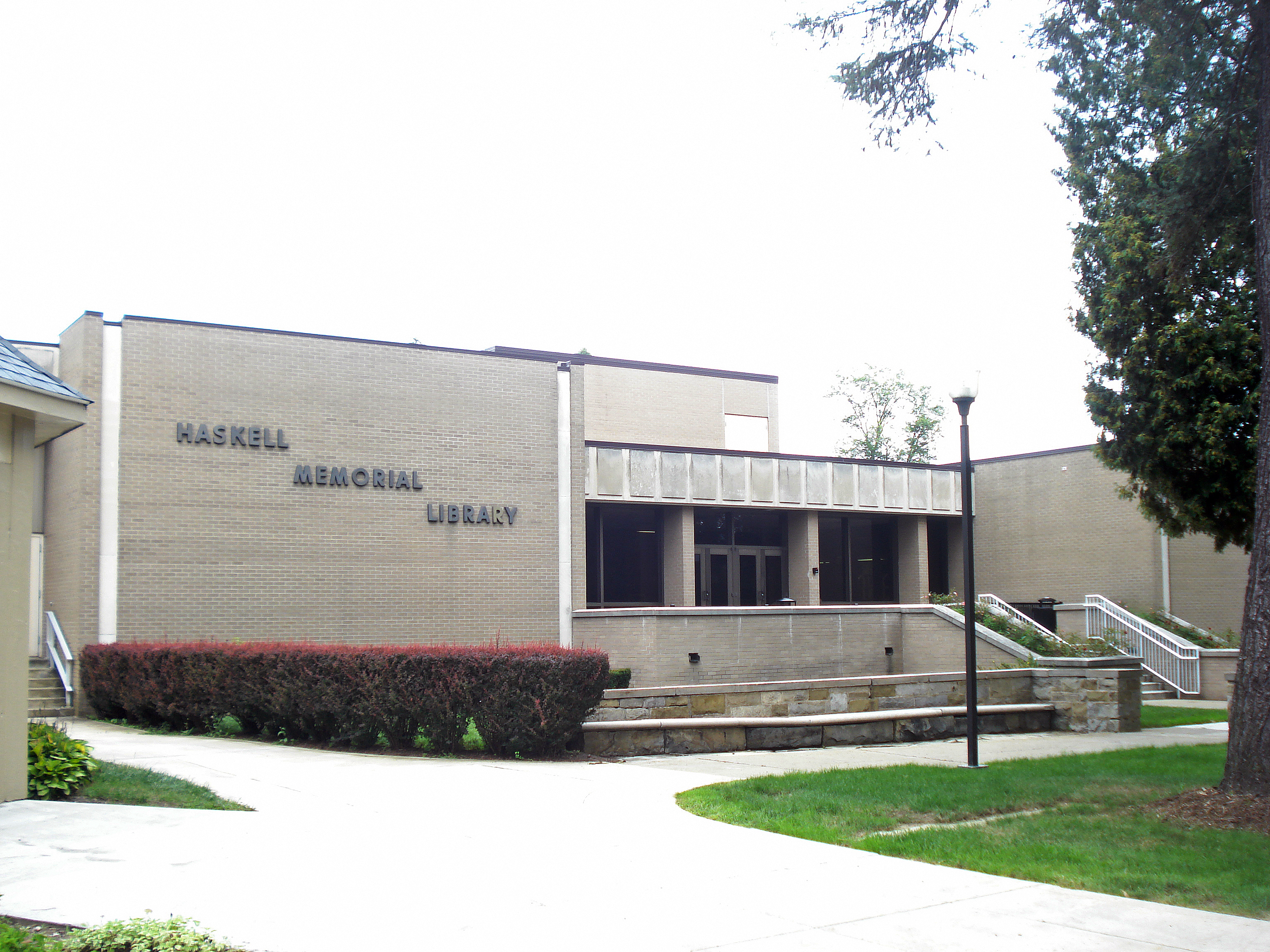
University of Pittsburgh at Titusville

- University of Pittsburgh at Titusville
- Northern Pennsylvania Regional College

== Notable people ==
- Joseph Bushnell Ames (1878–1928), novelist
- Peter Ashmun Ames (1888–1920), British Army intelligence officer
- William Henry Andrews (1846–1919), politician
- J. J. Bleday (b. 1997), baseball player signed to Miami Marlins; attended Titusville High School
- Julien Bryan (1899–1974), photographer, filmmaker, and documentarian during World War II
- Axtell J. Byles (1880–1941), football player and coach
- Shane Callahan, film and television actor
- Edwin L. Drake (1819–1880), first American to successfully drill for oil; discovered in Titusville
- Ralph Dunn (1900–1968), actor and filmmaker
- Thomas Griffin (1857–1933), MLB player
- William Draper Harkins (1873–1951) chemist, notable for his contributions to nuclear chemistry
- Ray Harroun (1879–1968), race car driver; first Indianapolis 500 winner
- Thomas Hazzard (1871–1957), football player and Christian minister
- John Heisman (1869–1936), player and coach of football, baseball, and basketball, as well as a sportswriter and actor
- Helen Jepson (1904–1997), opera singer
- Paul S. L. Johnson (1873–1950), scholar and pastor, founder of the Laymen's Home Missionary Movement
- Harry Jordan (1873–1920), Major League Baseball pitcher for the Pittsburgh Pirates
- Leal Mack (1892-1962), illustrator and painter
- R. A. Mihailoff, actor and wrestler
- David N. Ott (1937–2020), Maine state representative and lawyer
- John E. Peterson (b. 1938), congressman
- Dane Rauschenberg (b. 1976), endurance athlete
- Rocky Reynolds, professional wrestler; former four-time NWA World Junior Heavyweight Champion
- Jeannie Seely (1940-2025), Grand Ole Opry Star
- John Washington Steele (1843–1920), flamboyant oilman, first millionaire from oil
- Ida Tarbell (1857–1944), teacher, journalist
- Ray Tesser (1912–1982), NFL player
- Francis Thompson, film director
- A. Leo Weil (1858–1938), lawyer

== In popular culture ==
- American rapper Afroman says, "Did a show that night in Titusville/Afro is the tightest and that's for real" in the song "Pimpin Pennsylvania".
- American singer, songwriter, musician, and actor Johnny Cash mentioned the story of Titusville and performed a song about it on the Johnny Cash Show in 1970.

== See also ==
- Oil Region
