= Philadelphia and Erie Railroad main line =

History
- Opened: December 18, 1854

Technical
- Line length: 287.56 mi (462.78 km)
- Track gauge: 1,435 mm (4 ft 8 1/2 in) standard gauge

The main line of the Philadelphia and Erie Railroad is a partially-abandoned railroad line in the state of Pennsylvania. It was constructed between 1852 and 1864 by the Philadelphia and Erie Railroad, also known as the Sunbury and Eastern Railroad. At its fullest extent, it ran approximately 286 miles (460 km) from Erie, Pennsylvania, to Sunbury, Pennsylvania. The line became part of the Pennsylvania Railroad system. Following the Penn Central bankruptcy the line was split. Today, the western end belongs to the Buffalo and Pittsburgh Railroad, while the eastern end is part of the Norfolk Southern Railway's Buffalo Line.

== History ==
=== Construction ===
The Sunbury and Erie Railroad was incorporated on April 3, 1837. Construction was delayed by the Panic of 1837, and construction did not begin until 1851. Successive chief engineers identified two routes: a more southerly route via DuBois and Franklin, or a northerly route via Warren. The latter possessed steeper grades, but was more favorable to the land speculation of the company's investors and was therefore selected.

The main line opened between Williamsport and Milton on December 18, 1854. It was extended east to Sunbury in September 1855. In the west, the line was completed to Lock Haven on July, 1859, and then on to the Rattlesnake Creek at Whetham, 16.8 miles (27.0 km) west of Lock Haven, at the end of year. Separately, the company built a line between Erie and Warren, 66 miles (106 km), on December 15, 1859. This left a 140-mile (230 km) gap between the two sections.

The company was renamed the Philadelphia and Erie Railroad on March 7, 1861. The Pennsylvania Railroad leased the Philadelphia and Erie Railroad on January 1, 1862. With the financial backing of the Pennsylvania Railroad construction proceeded. The line was completed between Warren and Wilcox in 1863, between Whetham and St. Marys in January 1864, and between St. Marys and Wilcox on October 17, 1864.

=== Conrail ===
With the bankruptcy of the Penn Central, most of the former Philadelphia and Erie Railroad main line was conveyed to Conrail. The exception was the 26-mile (42 km) portion between Warren and Kane, considered uneconomic. Local politicians, including Victor J. Westerberg and Richard Frame, advocated for the line's preservation, and the Pennsylvania Department of Transportation purchased the line between Warren and Kane. Conrail continued to operate the entire line, with the state contributing a subsidy.

=== Short lines ===
Weakening traffic led Conrail to propose abandoning the line between Erie and St. Marys in 1981. Three local shippers–Struthers Wells Company in Warren, National Forge in Irvine, and Warren Car Company in Starbrick–founded the Irvine, Warren, Kane and Johnsonburg Railroad to acquire two line segments from Conrail: Irvine to Warren and Kane to Johnsonburg. The PennDOT-owned segment connected the two. To operate the line, the company contracted with Sloan Cornell, who owned the Gettysburg Railroad. Cornell established the Johnsonburg, Kane, Warren and Irvine Railroad for this purpose.

Low traffic volume continued to bedevil the line. In 1985, the Hammermill Paper Company, with the assistance of Congressman William Clinger, stepped in to preserve service over the line. In a series of transactions, Hammerill acquired the Erie–Irvine and Johnsonburg–St. Marys sections from Conrail, the Irvine–Warren and Kane–Johnsonburg sections from the Irvine, Warren, Kane and Johnsonburg Railroad, and the Warren–Kane section from PennDOT. Hammermill also acquired the St. Marys–Emporium section after Conrail abandoned it. Conrail remained the owner and operator of the east end between Emporium and Sunbury. Hammermill Paper created the Allegheny Railroad to operate the line.

International Paper, successor to Hammermill, sold the railroad property to Genesee & Wyoming, a shortline holding company in 1992. Genesee & Wyoming created the Allegheny and Eastern Railroad to operate the line. The Allegheny and Eastern abandoned the line between St. Marys and Emporium in 2003; it was subsequently converted into the West Creek Recreational Trail. Genesee & Wyoming merged the Allegheny and Eastern into the Buffalo and Pittsburgh Railroad on January 1, 2004.

The line between Sunbury and Emporium passed to the Norfolk Southern Railway following the breakup of Conrail in 1999 and is part of that company's Buffalo Line.
