= Johnsonburg, Kane, Warren and Irvine Railroad =

Defunct railroad company in Pennsylvania, United States

Overview
- Parent company: Irvine, Warren, Kane and Johnsonburg Railroad
- Headquarters: Kane, Pennsylvania
- Reporting mark: JKWI
- Dates of operation: 1982–1985
- Successor: Allegheny Railroad

Technical
- Track gauge: 1,435 mm (4 ft 8 1/2 in)

The Johnsonburg, Kane, Warren and Irvine Railroad (reporting mark JKWI) was a railroad company in Pennsylvania, United States. It was formed in 1982 to operate part of the Philadelphia and Erie Railroad main line which Conrail would have otherwise abandoned. The company ceased operations in 1985 with the creation of the Allegheny Railroad.

== History ==
In 1981, Conrail proposed abandoning the Philadelphia and Erie Railroad main line between Erie, Pennsylvania, and St. Marys, Pennsylvania. Three shippers who would be affected by the abandonment–Struthers Wells Company in Warren, National Forge in Irvine, and Warren Car Company in Starbrick–formed a new company, the Irvine, Warren, Kane and Johnsonburg Railroad, to acquire two line segments from Conrail: Irvine to Warren and Kane to Johnsonburg. The Pennsylvania Department of Transportation already owned the segment between Warren and Kane.

To operate the line, the owners contracted with Sloan Cornell, who also owned the Knox and Kane Railroad. The Johnsonburg, Kane, Warren and Irvine Railroad began operating in July 1982. This operation lasted until 1985, when the Hammermill Paper Company acquired the lines of the Irvine, Warren, Kane and Johnsonburg Railroad, along with the rest of the Philadelphia and Erie Railroad main line west of Emporium. The Allegheny Railroad, a subsidiary of Hammermill, began operating on September 3, 1985.
