= Kenneth Jadlowiec =

American politician (1951–2024)

Member of the Pennsylvania House of Representatives from the 67th district
- In office January 6, 1987 – January 7, 2003
- Preceded by: William D. Mackowski
- Succeeded by: Martin Causer

Personal details
- Born: January 12, 1951 Pittsburgh, Pennsylvania, U.S.
- Died: August 13, 2024 (aged 73) Sarasota, Florida, U.S.
- Party: Republican
- Spouse: Denise E. Mackowski (m. 1971)
- Children: 2

Kenneth M. Jadlowiec (January 12, 1951 – August 13, 2024) was an American politician who served as a Republican member of the Pennsylvania House of Representatives.

He graduated from North Hills High School in 1968, and attended Edinboro University from 1968 through 1971. He married Denise E. Mackowski in 1971, and they had two sons.

He was first elected to represent the 67th legislative district in the Pennsylvania House of Representatives in 1986. He retired following the 2002 election.

Jadlowiec died at the age of 73 on August 13, 2024, in Sarasota, Florida.
