= Genesee and Wyoming Railroad =

Defunct short line railroad

Genesee & Wyoming Railroad

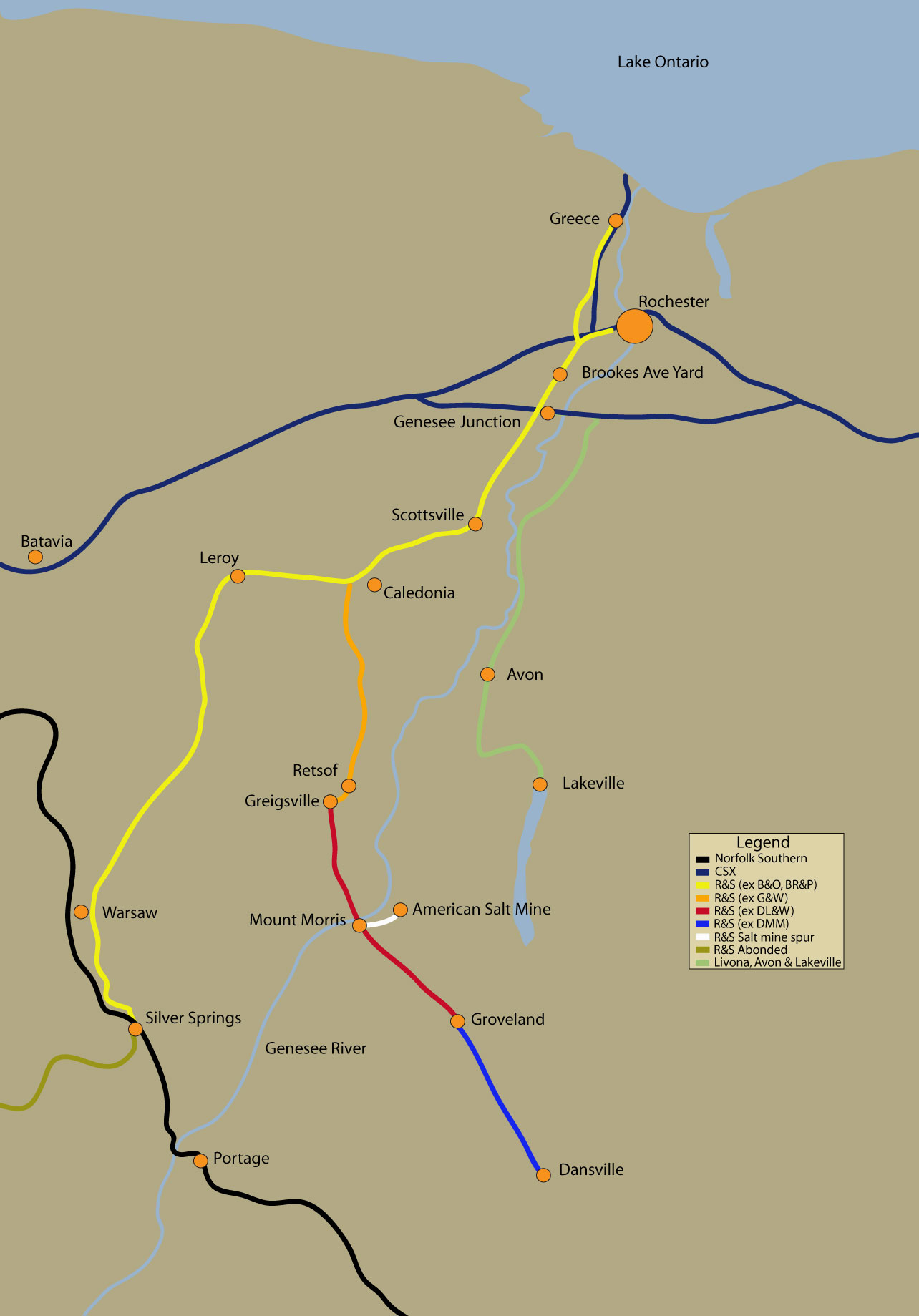
- 2007 Rochester and Southern Railroad map showing the Genesee and Wyoming Railroad in orange.

Overview
- Headquarters: Rochester, New York
- Reporting mark: GNWR
- Locale: New York
- Dates of operation: 1891–Present

Technical
- Track gauge: 4 ft 8 1/2 in (1,435 mm) standard gauge

Founded in 1891 as the Genessee & Wyoming Valley Railroad, the Genesee and Wyoming Railroad (reporting mark GNWR) was a flagship short-line railroad owned by Genesee & Wyoming Inc., originally a 14.5 miles (23.3 km) Western NY salt-hauling railroad that ran between Retsof, NY and Caledonia, NY.

Dropping the "Valley" from its name in 1899 at the time of incorporation as the present legal entity, G&W was the first railroad in today's global G&W corporation "family" of shortlines all over the world. "G&W Orange", that began on the G&W railroad, can today be seen on railroads all over the world.

== History ==
The railroad was founded after salt deposits were found in Wyoming County, NY, in order to connect the salt mines of the region to the adjacent Western New York & Pennsylvania and Delaware, Lackawanna and Western railroads.

In 1895 the railroad was involved in a contentious dispute with one of the salt mining interests that very nearly erupted in violence.

Genesee Street and Wyoming Street in the West Bottoms, the former site of the Kansas City Stockyards are named for the railroad.

The railroad was converted into a non-operating subsidiary in 1977 and its remaining holdings absorbed into the Rochester and Southern Railroad system in 2003, but still exists on paper and as the namesake of its parent company.

Genesee & Wyoming Inc. continues to ship salt out of the region to this day, via subsidiary Rochester and Southern Railroad, primarily for the American Rock Salt Company.
