= New Castle Branch =

New Castle Branch refers to the following rail lines:

- Erie Railroad lines:
  - New Castle Branch (Erie Railroad), Sharon to New Castle, Pennsylvania
- Pennsylvania Railroad lines:
  - New Castle Cut-off, Wilmington to New Castle, Delaware
  - New Castle Branch (Pennsylvania Railroad), New Castle to Stoneboro, Pennsylvania
