= Martin Causer =

American politician

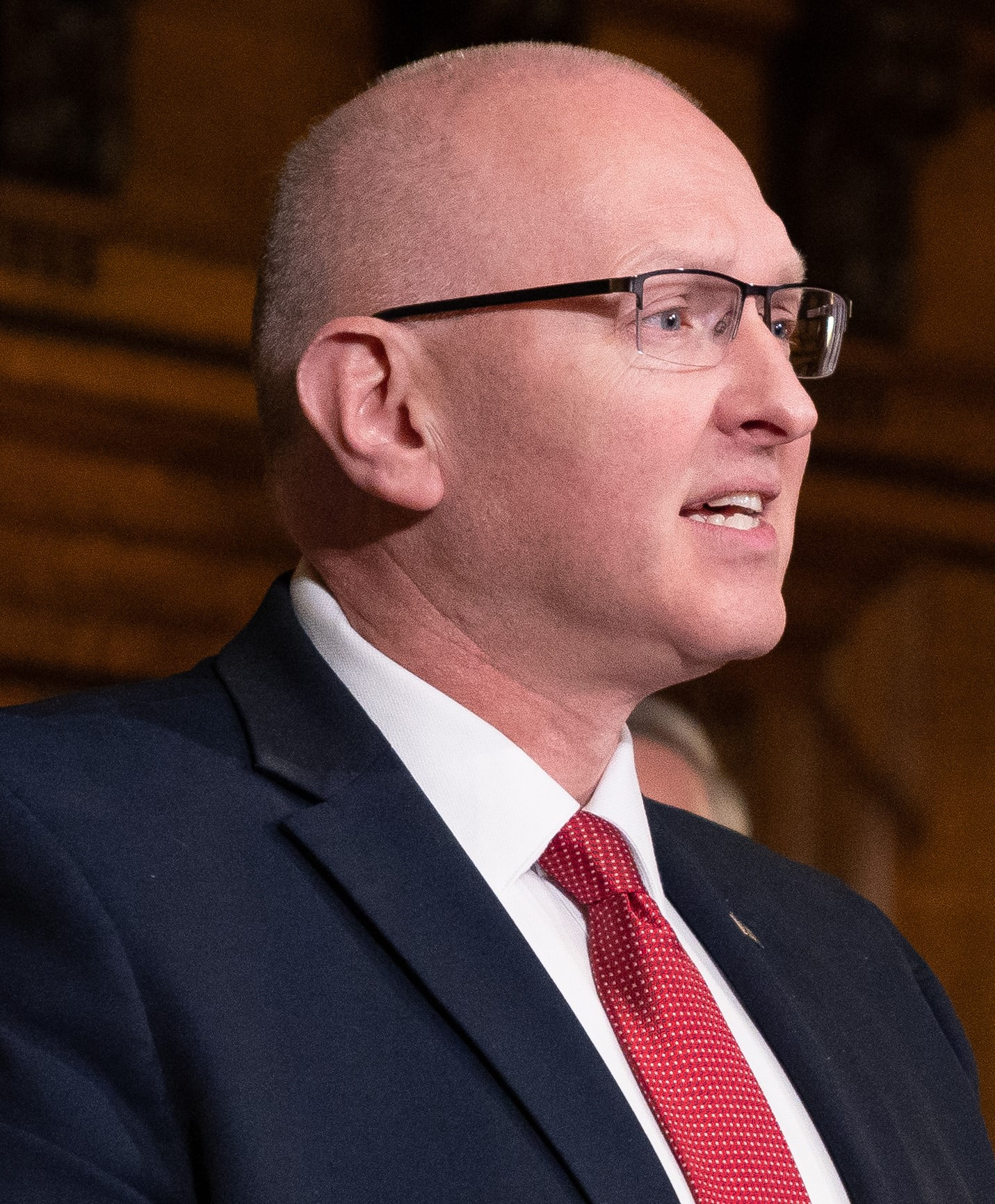

Member of the Pennsylvania House of Representatives from the 67th district
- Incumbent
- Assumed office January 7, 2003
- Preceded by: Kenneth M. Jadlowiec

Personal details
- Born: 1973 (age 52–53) Coudersport, Pennsylvania, U.S.
- Party: Republican
- Education: University of Pittsburgh
- Website: www.repcauser.com

Martin T. Causer is an American politician serving as a Republican member of the Pennsylvania House of Representatives for the 67th District and was elected in 2002. He currently serves on the House Commerce, Environmental Resources and Energy and Veterans Affairs and Emergency Preparedness Committees. He was named Republican Chairman of the Subcommittee on Parks and Forests within the Environmental Resources and Energy Committee, and of the Subcommittee on Programs and Benefits of the Aging and Older Adult Services Committee.

== Personal life ==
Causer graduated from the University of Pittsburgh at Bradford, earning a bachelor's degree in history and political science. He currently lives in Turtlepoint, in Annin Township. Causer has three children.
