= Pennsylvania House of Representatives, District 67 =

American legislative district

Pennsylvania's 67th State House of Representatives district
Representative
Martin Causer; R–Turtlepoint

The 67th Pennsylvania House of Representatives District is located in northern Pennsylvania and has been represented by Martin Causer since 2003.

== District profile ==
The 67th District includes all of Potter County, Cameron County and McKean County. It is the largest house district by land area in Pennsylvania.

== Representatives ==
Representative	Party	Years	District home	Note
Prior to 1969, seats were apportioned by county.
Victor J. Westerberg	Republican	1969 – 1976		
William D. Mackowski	Republican	1977 – 1986		
Kenneth M. Jadlowiec	Republican	1987 – 2002		
Martin Causer	Republican	2003 – present	Turtlepoint	Incumbent

== Recent election results ==
PA House election, 2024: Pennsylvania House, District 67
Party	Candidate	Votes	%
Republican	Martin Causer (incumbent)	25,135	81.91
Democratic	Rajeev Pradhan	5,551	18.09
Total votes		30,686	100.00
Republican hold			

PA House election, 2022: Pennsylvania House, District 67
Party	Candidate	Votes	%
Republican	Martin Causer (incumbent)	Unopposed	
Total votes		21,089	100.00
Republican hold			

PA House election, 2020: Pennsylvania House, District 67
Party	Candidate	Votes	%
Republican	Martin Causer (incumbent)	Unopposed	
Total votes		27,302	100.00
Republican hold			

PA House election, 2018: Pennsylvania House, District 67
Party	Candidate	Votes	%
Republican	Martin Causer (incumbent)	15,823	78.75
Democratic	Maryanne Cole	4,270	21.25
Total votes		20,093	100.00
Republican hold			

PA House election, 2016: Pennsylvania House, District 67
Party	Candidate	Votes	%
Republican	Martin Causer (incumbent)	Unopposed	
Total votes		22,746	100.00
Republican hold			
