= Western New York and Pennsylvania Railroad =

Western New York and Pennsylvania Railroad may refer to:

- Western New York and Pennsylvania Railroad (2001), a short line
- Western New York and Pennsylvania Railway (1895–1955), predecessor of the Pennsylvania Railroad
  - Western New York and Pennsylvania Railroad (1887–95), predecessor of the above
