= GNWR =

GNWR may refer to:

- Genesee and Wyoming Railroad - former American railroad with GNWR reporting mark
- Great North Western Railway - working name for train services in England that will be operated by Grand Central
