= Waterboro =

Waterboro may refer to a place in the United States:

- Waterboro, Maine
- Waterboro, New York
