= Livonia, Avon and Lakeville Railroad =

Railroad in New York, United States

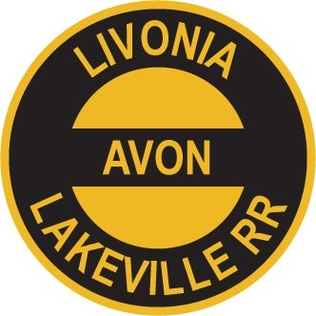

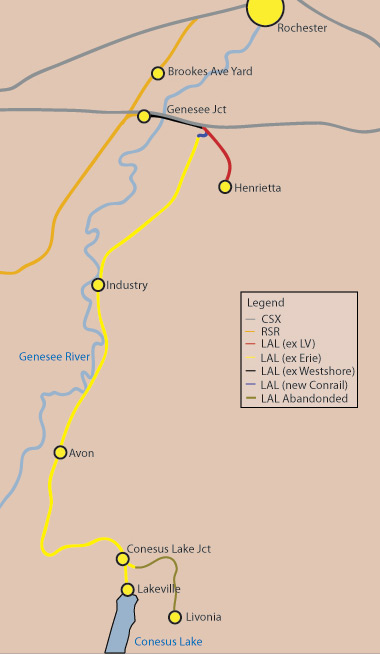

Overview
- Headquarters: Lakeville, New York
- Reporting mark: LAL
- Locale: New York
- Dates of operation: 1964–present

Technical
- Track gauge: 4 ft 8 1/2 in (1,435 mm) standard gauge
- Length: 400 miles (640 km)

Other
- Website: https://lalrr.com//

The Livonia, Avon and Lakeville Railroad (reporting mark LAL) is a short line railroad that operates in Livingston County and Monroe County in New York, United States. The railroad interchanges with CSX at Genesee Junction in Chili, New York, the Rochester and Southern Railroad (RSR) at Genesee Junction and the RSR's Brooks Avenue Yard in Gates, New York, and with the Rochester & Genesee Valley Railroad Museum at Industry, New York. Their primary freight consists of food products: grains and corn syrup. In 1997, the Livonia, Avon and Lakeville Railroad was selected as Short Line Railroad of the Year by industry trade journal Railway Age. The LAL is also the parent company for the Bath and Hammondsport Railroad, the Western New York and Pennsylvania Railroad and the Ontario Midland Railroad.

== History ==
=== The beginning ===
The route that is now the Livonia, Avon & Lakeville started in the mid-19th century. Originally, the line from Mortimer to Avon was part of the Rochester & Genesee Valley Railroad – which had constructed an 18-mile route from downtown Rochester, New York, to Avon, New York, by 1851. Eventually this became part of the Erie Railroad, then part of the Erie-Lackawanna Railroad in 1960, when the Erie merged with the Delaware, Lackawanna and Western Railroad.

The Livonia Avon & Lakeville Railroad was born when members of the Livonia community decided to rescue the railroad after news came that the Erie-Lackawanna Railroad was to abandon its spur south from Avon connecting Lakeville and Livonia. In 1964, members of the community, led by Chester A. Haak and Harry J. Moran, began a campaign to purchase the soon to be abandoned line from the Erie-Lackawanna for $13,000.

After its incorporation in May 1964, passenger excursions began with the use of GE 45-Tonner #97. This engine was sold a year later, and replaced by GE 44-tonner #10. The next year, after acquiring #17, a 2-8-2 steam locomotive and a former Savannah and Atlanta Railway locomotive, the LA&L used this engine for all passenger excursion operations with the old Erie depot in Livonia as excursion headquarters. Three years later, #17 began to develop mechanical issues, and was replaced with #38, a 2-8-0 steam locomotive. #17 was later sold to a Rochester businessman who sold it for scrap. In 1972, the railroad acquired its first ALCO diesel locomotive #20, an ALCO RS-1. Three years after this, in 1975, #38 was stored out of service in need of major boiler repairs.

=== Conrail years ===
On April 1, 1976, six major railroads in the northeast United States became one, Conrail. Conrail was now the interchange railroad in Avon, NY, as opposed to the EL. During the planning of Conrail, the LA&L petitioned the United States Railroad Administration to give them the Avon-Caledonia branch of the EL which would have allowed them to interchange with the Chessie System in Caledonia, as well as Conrail. However, the line was excluded from Conrail and later abandoned. In 1977, growing insurance costs forced the LA&L to discontinue passenger excursions.

1980 saw the LAL purchasing their second ALCO, #72, an Alco S2, followed by the selling of the #10. In 1981, the line to Livonia was abandoned due to a lack of support from the state of New York to repair an aging bridge. After the abandonment, the LA&L built a team track in Lakeville to service its customers. In this year, the LA&L also acquired another ALCO locomotive, this time a C-425, numbered 425. When 1982 rolled around it was decided that a classification yard was needed in Lakeville to handle the growing amount of traffic that the railroad was receiving. Later in 1988, this five track yard was completed. Two years later, an engine shop and office building were built next to the yard.

In 1995, the LA&L acquired yet another engine, an ALCO C-420 numbered 420. The shop was extended to hold two coupled road engines.

In 1996, the LAL acquired Conrail's "Rochester South Cluster" pursuant to the Interstate Commerce Commission Termination Act of 1995. Instead of interchanging in Avon, the LAL now operated north to Genesee Junction, where they would interchange with Conrail. The railroad launched a $1.4 million rehabilitation effort.

In the same year, the LA&L began operation of the former Champagne Railroad, now known as the Bath and Hammondsport Railroad, previously owned and operated by the Steuben County Industrial Development Agency. With this deal, the LA&L inherited the use of the railroad's two remaining ALCO S1 engines, numbers 4 and 5, to service the newly acquired railroad. With this acquisition, the railroad grew to 65 route miles. Also, four ALCO C-424m locomotives were purchased. The LA&L was also named "Industry of the Year" by the Livingston County Chamber of Commerce.

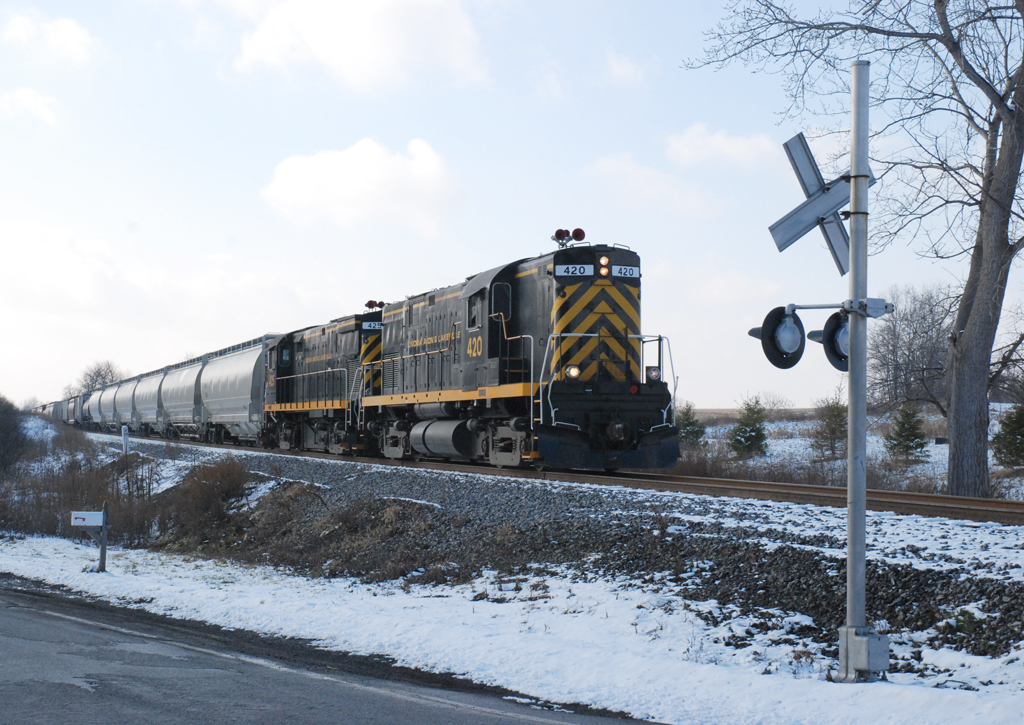
LAL 420 & 425 headed north to Genesee Junction.

=== Continued expansion ===
In 1997, CSX and Norfolk Southern Railway applied to split Conrail, the LA&L filed an application to remove the paper barrier that had kept the railroad from interchanging with the Rochester & Southern at Genesee Junction. With fierce opposition from CSX, the Surface Transportation Board granted the LA&L trackage rights across the Genesee Junction Yard, trackage rights into the R&S and its yard at Brooks Avenue, and haulage rights on the R&S to Silver Springs, New York. This gave the LA&L access to three Class I railroads: CSX, Norfolk Southern, and Canadian Pacific Railway.

1998 was a busy year for the LAL. A number of infrastructure rehabilitation projects resulted in the line from Lakeville to Genesee Jct becoming a 25MPH railroad – not the 5-10MPH that had been. The B&H also saw improvements on the northern end of the line, including the reactivation of ten miles of previously unused rail between Cohocton and Wayland, NY. New track was also built to serve a new road de-icer processing facility. Also in this year, the LA&L gained a controlling interest in the Ontario Central Railroad. Due to the Conrail split, the ONCT finally received competitive connections to CSX, NS, CP Rail, and NYSW by way of the Finger Lakes Railway.

During 1999, the bridge on Pole Bridge Road was upgraded to handle 286,000 pound railroad cars. Avon Yard was also rebuilt into its current configuration. The Lakeville shop was expanded to accommodate three coupled road engines with additional floor space in a separate bay to facilitate locomotive repair. Two of the ALCO C-424m locomotives purchased in 1995 were repaired and reactivated, emerging as numbers 423 and 424.

In 2001, the LA&L began operations on the former Erie-Lackawanna mainline between Hornell, New York, and Corry, Pennsylvania, as the Western New York and Pennsylvania Railroad. The railroad initially provided rail service between Olean and Jamestown, New York, but eventually extended to more of the line as out-of-service sections were reactivated. In October of that year, the Cohocton Valley Rail Corp. was renamed as the Bath & Hammondsport Rail Corp. Subsidiary WNYP leased additional trackage from Norfolk Southern in 2005 extending from Meadville, PA to Oil City, PA.

In 2007, the STB granted an exemption to Finger Lakes Railway allowing them to acquire the Ontario Central from LAL. With the completion of the transaction, ONCT RS-36 418 was permanently transferred from LAL. From May through September, the LAL was busy upgrading the majority of its 30-mile mainline from 105 Lbs jointed rail to 127Lbs welded rail - allowing faster trains with heavier loads. Additionally, in 2007 a new Barilla Pasta plant opened in Avon, which receives grains via rail. According to Barilla's US top executive, Kirk Trofholz, the availability of rail transport was "a must" when choosing the location for the plant.

The WNYP saw massive expansion, with the leasing of NS tracks from Machias, New York, south through Olean, NY, to Driftwood, PA. Along with the trackage, the company purchased or leased eight 6-axle Alcos.

On May 9, 2015, the LA&L celebrated its 50th anniversary. Excursion trains were run between Lakeville, New York, and Henrietta, New York, followed by a night photo shoot of the locomotives to commemorate the milestone.

On September 16, 2022, the Livonia, Avon & Lakeville Railroad acquired the controlling stake of Ontario Midland Railroad by purchasing 55% of its stock according to paperwork filed with the Surface Transportation Board. The OMID, based in Sodus, New York, operates 52 miles (84 km) of track in Wayne and Monroe counties.

== Locomotive roster ==
The Livonia, Avon and Lakeville Railroad has a roster made up of primarily ALCO locomotives. The LA&L rosters an S-2 (#72) built in 1941, an RS-1 (#20) built in 1949, two S-1s (#4 and 5), one C-420 (#420), seven C-424s (#421, 422, 423, 424, 426, 427, 428), four of which are of the C-424m rebuilt variant, one C-425 (#425), four C-430s (#430, 431, 432, 433), one C-630 (#630), one M-630 (#631), and an RS-36 (#418). Several of the locomotives are lettered for LA&L subsidiaries Bath & Hammondsport or Western New York & Pennsylvania.

Before the road became an all-Alco road, their roster consisted of a Baldwin 2-8-2 (#17), a GE 45 Tonner with side rods (#97), and in later years, one GE 44 Tonner (#10) and one 2-8-0 (#38). Number 17 was scrapped in Lakeville after being sold to a Rochester area business-man. Number 38 survives on the Everett Railroad at Duncansville, PA. Former #97 was later sold to Rochester Gas and Electric, where it was used to switch coal cars at Bee Bee Station. When Bee Bee station closed in the early 1990s, the locomotive was donated to the Rochester & Genesee Valley Railroad Museum, where it has been restored to operating condition as RGE #1941.

== Trackage ==
The LAL has trackage rights at CSX's Genesee Junction Yard, allowing the LAL to interchange with the Rochester and Southern Railroad as well as CSX. LAL ownership begins at the east end of Genesee Junction with the former Conrail non-controlled siding that runs parallel to the West Shore Branch from Genesee Junction Yard to MP 360. There, the line heads south onto what was once Erie-Lackawanna Railroad and Lehigh Valley Railroad trackage. Shortly after crossing Jefferson Road (NY-252), the track splits, with one track, the ex-LV Rochester Branch, heading southeast to a pair of online businesses on Lehigh Station Road (NY-253) before coming to an end, while the other track, ex-EL trackage, continues south/southwest towards Avon and eventually hits the Lakeville terminus, ending just shy of Conesus Lake, at one time a Steam Boat terminal.

In Avon, there is a short branch to Kraft Foods, which is the only remaining part of the Erie's branch to Mount Morris, New York. In 1994 the LAL reactivated a spur to a grain elevator on Bronson Hill Road. This spur was formerly part of the Livonia Branch of the LAL which had been abandoned in 1981.

The LAL has a three-track yard in the town of Avon which was expanded in 2008 due to increased traffic to Barilla Pasta's manufacturing plant in Avon which opened in 2007. Lakeville is the site of a five-track class-yard and a four-track engine house as well as ADM and Sweeteners Plus.

Short Line Railroad of the Year
1997
