= Buffalo Line =

Rail line in New York and Pennsylvania

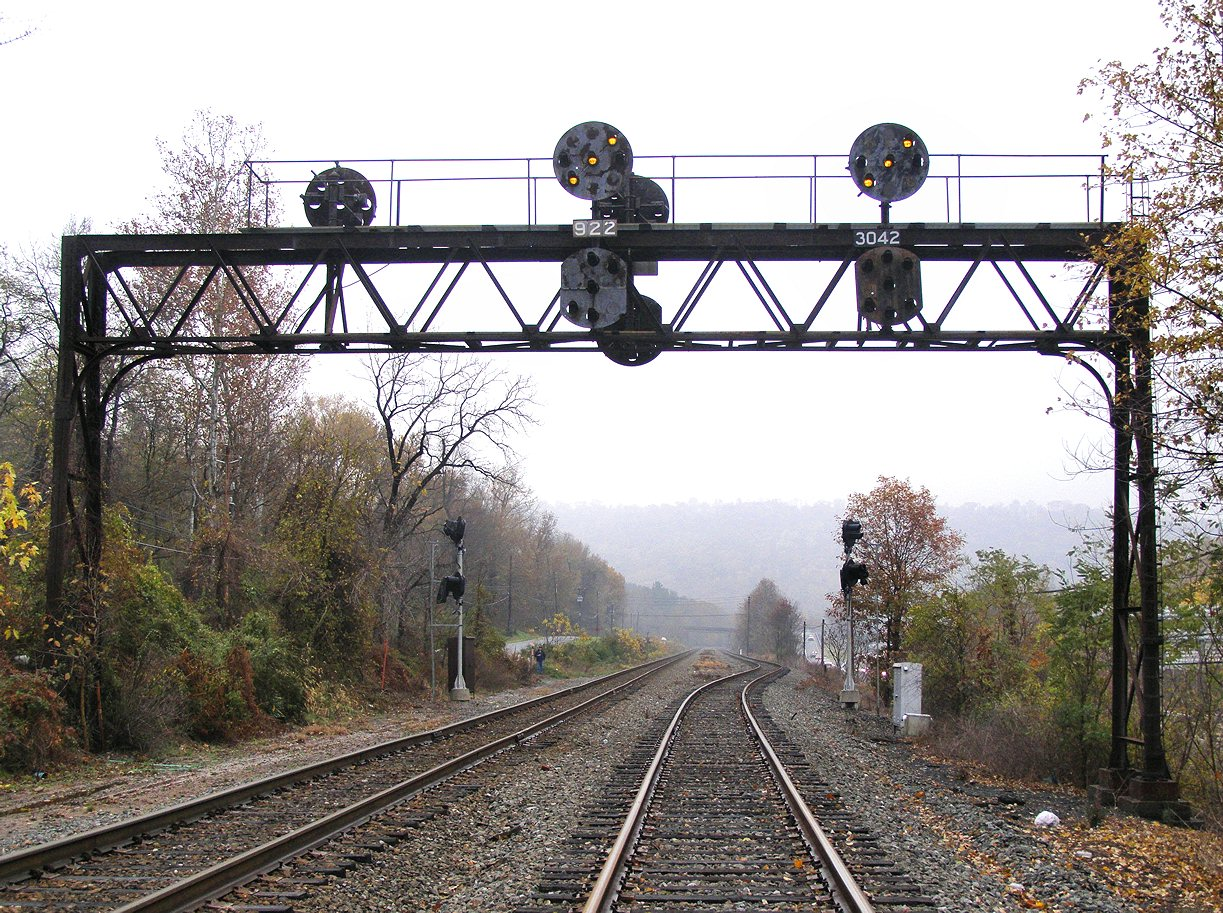
- The Buffalo Line north of Rockville, Pennsylvania, with an old Pennsylvania Railroad signal bridge that has since been removed

Overview
- Status: Operational
- Owner: Norfolk Southern Railway
- Locale: New York and Pennsylvania
- Termini: Buffalo, New York; Rockville, Pennsylvania

Service
- Type: Freight rail
- System: Norfolk Southern Railway
- Operator(s): Buffalo and Pittsburgh Railroad (Buffalo-Machias, New York); Western New York and Pennsylvania Railroad (Machias-Driftwood, Pennsylvania); Norfolk Southern Railway (Driftwood-Rockville)

History
- Opened: 1854

Technical
- Number of tracks: 1-2
- Track gauge: 4 ft 8 1/2 in (1,435 mm) standard gauge

The Buffalo Line (also known as the River Line) is a railroad line owned by the Norfolk Southern Railway in the U.S. states of New York and Pennsylvania. The line runs from Buffalo, New York southeast to Rockville, Pennsylvania near Harrisburg, Pennsylvania along a former Pennsylvania Railroad line. Its north end is at Seneca Yard in Buffalo, with no direct access to the Lake Erie district, and its south end is at the Pittsburgh Line at Rockville. The line is operated by the Buffalo and Pittsburgh Railroad between Buffalo and Machias, New York, the Western New York and Pennsylvania Railroad between Machias and Driftwood, Pennsylvania, and the Norfolk Southern Railway between Driftwood and Rockville.

== History ==
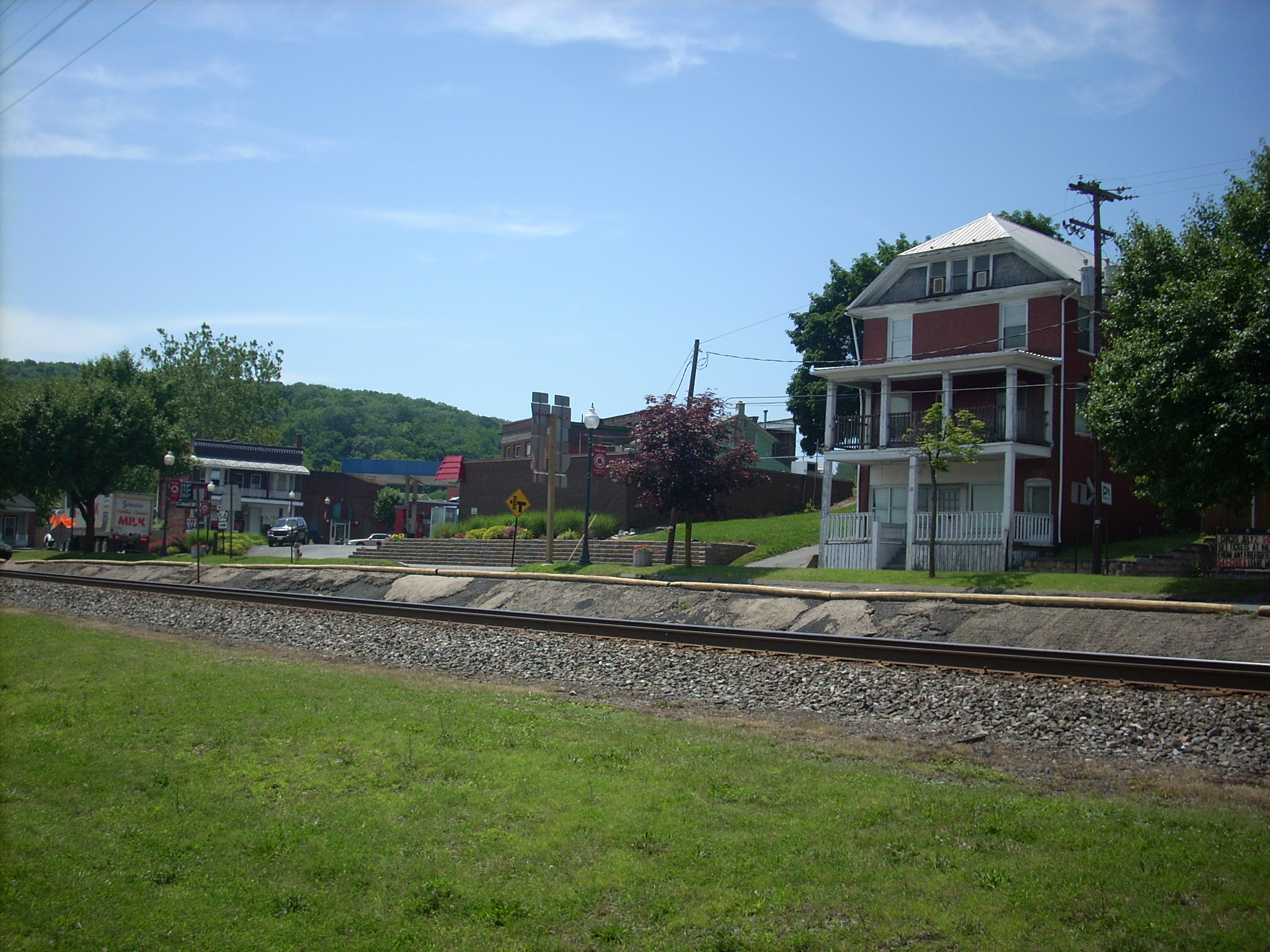
The Buffalo Line in Montgomery, Pennsylvania

The Sunbury and Erie Railroad opened from Williamsport, Pennsylvania south to Milton in 1854, Northumberland in 1855, and Sunbury in 1856. Extensions west from Williamsport opened to Whetham in 1859, Keating (as the Philadelphia and Erie Railroad) in 1862, reorganize in 1895 to Western New York and Pennsylvania Railway, and finally reaching Emporium (also as the P&E) in 1863. A cutoff bypassing downtown Williamsport to the south, from Allen's west to Nisbet, opened in the early 1870s, and is now part of the Buffalo Line.

The Northern Central Railway opened a line from Dauphin, Pennsylvania north to Millersburg in 1856, extending it north to Herndon in 1857 and Sunbury in 1858. In 1882, the Pennsylvania Railroad opened their Rockville Branch from Rockville (on their main line) north to Dauphin on the Northern Central.

From the Buffalo end, the Buffalo and Washington Railway opened its line to East Aurora, New York in 1868 and South Wales in 1870. In 1871 its name was changed to the Buffalo, New York and Philadelphia Railway, and it was extended to Emporium, Pennsylvania in 1872, completing the line between Buffalo and Harrisburg. The newest piece of the Buffalo Line, opened in 1909, is at Buffalo, running from the old main line at Gardenville southwest to Seneca Yard.

The line became part of the Pennsylvania Railroad and Conrail through leases, mergers, and takeovers. In the 1999 breakup of Conrail it was assigned to Norfolk Southern. The Western New York and Pennsylvania Railroad has leased and been operating the part of the line between Machias, New York and Driftwood, Pennsylvania since 2007. By 2008, Norfolk Southern no longer used the line into Buffalo and leased it to the Buffalo & Pittsburgh, which now uses it to reach its Main Line in Machias, NY; this allowed the B&P to abandon and remove its old Third Subdivision (ex B&O) line between Orchard Park, NY and Ashford Jct. By 2009, NS had taken the portion from Gardenville Junction to Seneca Yard out of service; this left its Ebenezer Running Track from CSX's Buffalo Terminal Subdivision to Gardenville as the only connection between Buffalo and the line.

In 2009, the Western New York and Pennsylvania Railroad portion of the Buffalo Line was used to film scenes in the film Unstoppable. Filming took place over three months during the daylight hours while the railroad ran its regular services at night.

== Named passenger trains ==
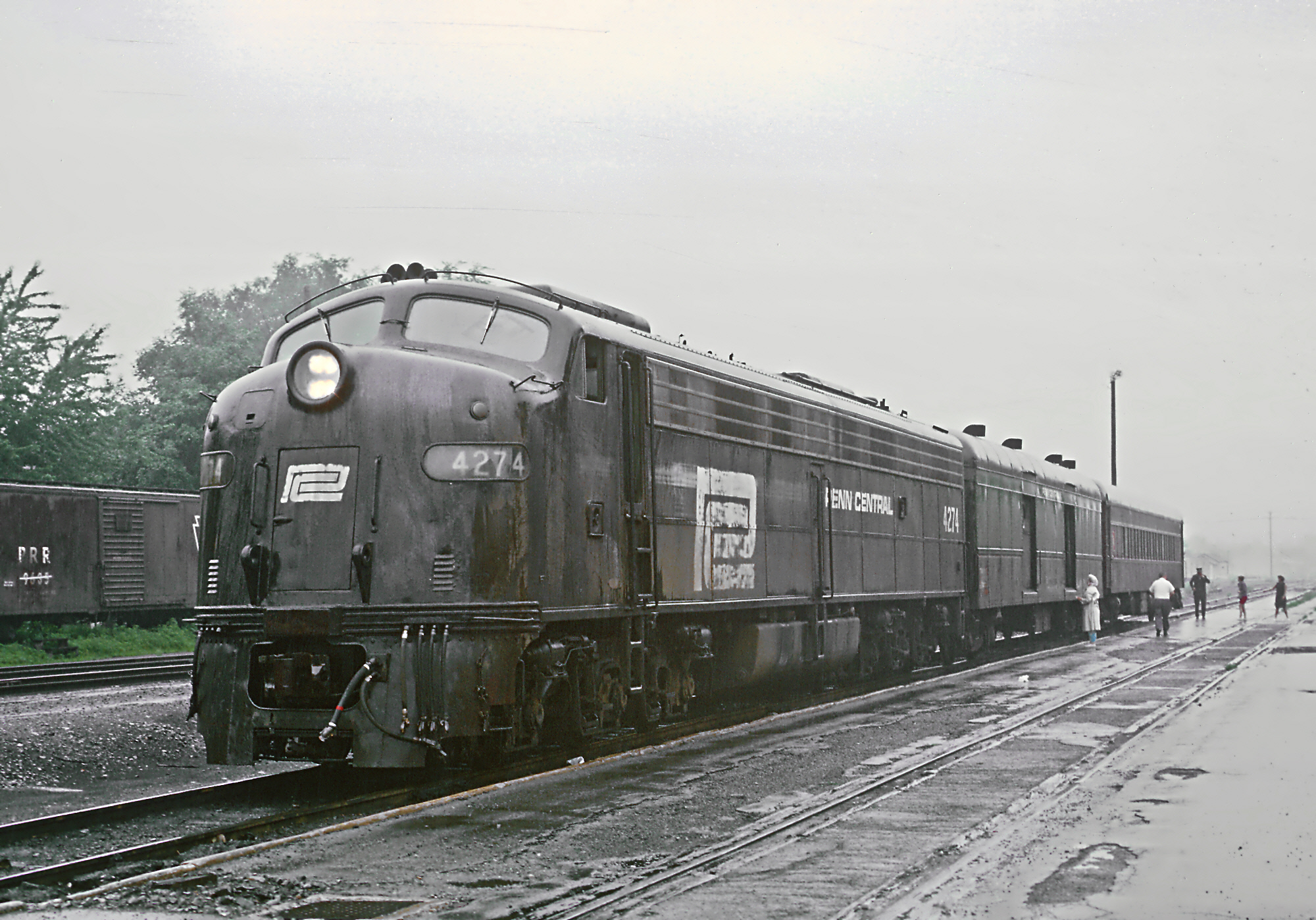
The Buffalo Day Express stands ready to depart Williamsport, PA on July 20, 1969. Passenger service along the line would end soon after.

When passenger trains ran on the line, Lock Haven (west of Williamsport) was a transfer point for trains to Pennsylvania State University 38 miles to the southwest of Lock Haven. The Pennsylvania Railroad ran several trains on this run between Buffalo and Washington, with major intermediate stops being Emporium, Williamsport, Harrisburg, York, and Baltimore. The last passenger train on the line was the Penn Central's unnamed Buffalo-Harrisburg successor to the Buffalo Day Express. Service ended on April 30, 1971, when Amtrak declined to pick up the route.

- Buffalo Day Express (Washington and Philadelphia—Buffalo train) / Baltimore Day Express (southbound train)
- Dominion Express (overnight train of the above route)
