= Victor J. Westerberg =

American politician

Member of the Pennsylvania House of Representatives from the 67th district
- In office 1969–1976
- Preceded by: District created
- Succeeded by: William D. Mackowski

Member of the Pennsylvania House of Representatives from the McKean County district
- In office 1965–1968

Personal details
- Born: February 6, 1912 Kane, Pennsylvania
- Died: March 1985 (aged 73) Kane, Pennsylvania
- Party: Republican

Victor J. Westerberg (February 6, 1912 – March 1985) is a former Republican member of the Pennsylvania House of Representatives.
