= New York and Lake Erie Railroad =

Railroad in Western New York

New York & Lake Erie
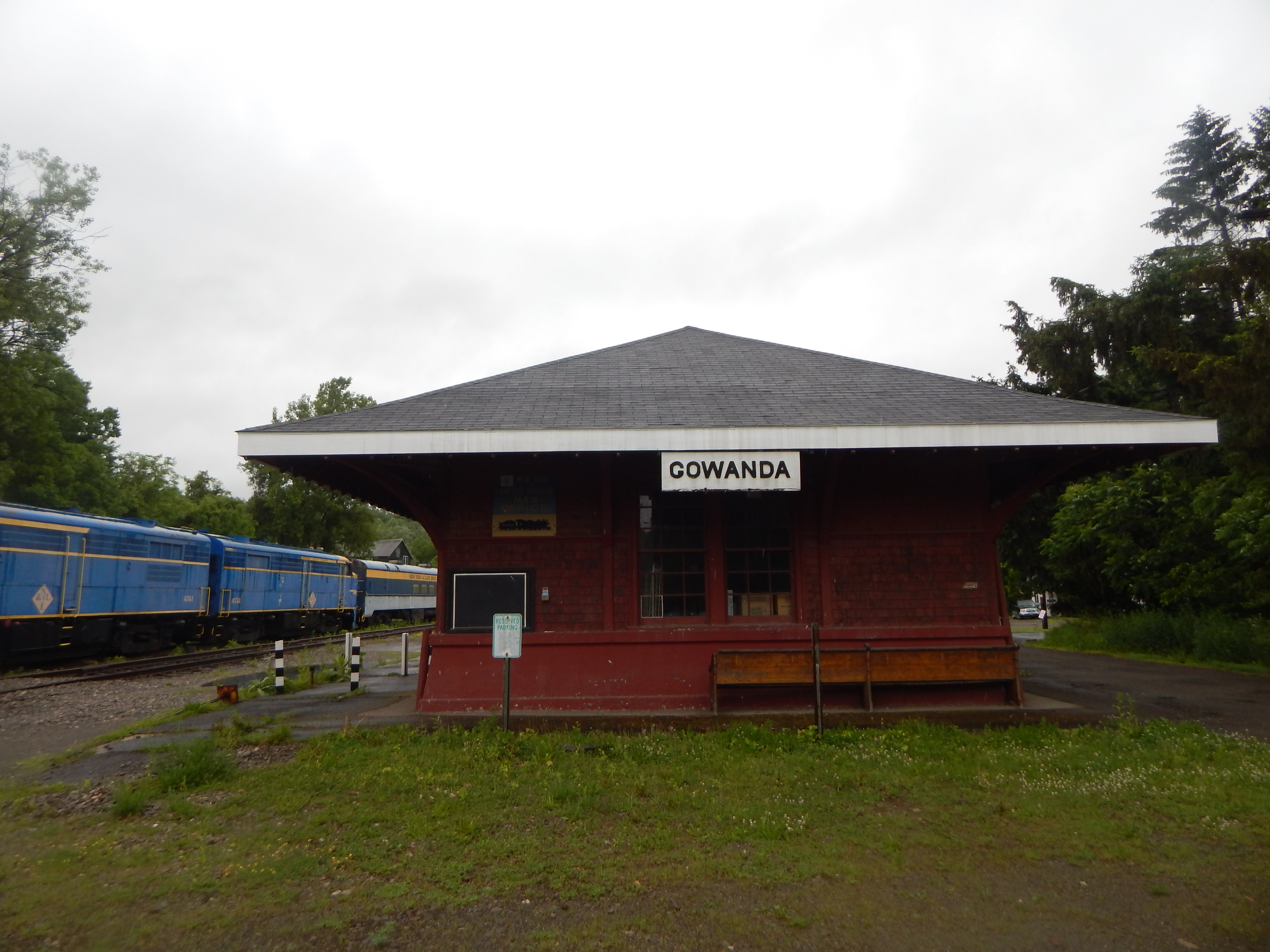
- The Gowanda station in May 2015, with NYLE equipment on the tracks to the left

Overview
- Headquarters: Gowanda, New York
- Reporting mark: NYLE
- Locale: New York
- Dates of operation: 1978–Present

Technical
- Track gauge: 4 ft 8 1/2 in (1,435 mm) standard gauge

Other
- Website: https://nylerailroad.com/

The New York & Lake Erie (reporting mark NYLE) is a class III railroad operating in Western New York. The NYLE was formed in 1978 to operate a portion of former Erie trackage that Conrail no longer wanted. Today, the railroad operates between Gowanda to Cherry Creek, New York. The main branch of the trackage connects with multiple railroads in Buffalo, New York and once connected with the now-WNYP owned (NS-leased) Southern Tier Line in Waterboro. However, that portion of the line (south of Conewango Valley) and the junction at Waterboro were decommissioned several years ago. The NYLE also operated a branch Line between Dayton and Salamanca, also connecting with the Southern Tier Line there, until 1990; the portion south of Cattaraugus was torn out and eventually replaced with the Pat McGee Trail in the early 2000s, while the portion north of Cattaraugus was damaged by floods and landslides in the 2010s and is also no longer operational.

NYLE was used as the setting for railroad scenes in the 1987 film Planes, Trains & Automobiles and the railroad tracks and depot in South Dayton, along with other portions of the village, were featured in the 1983 Robert Redford movie The Natural. The NYLE is also the owner and operator of Oil Creek and Titusville Lines, Inc.

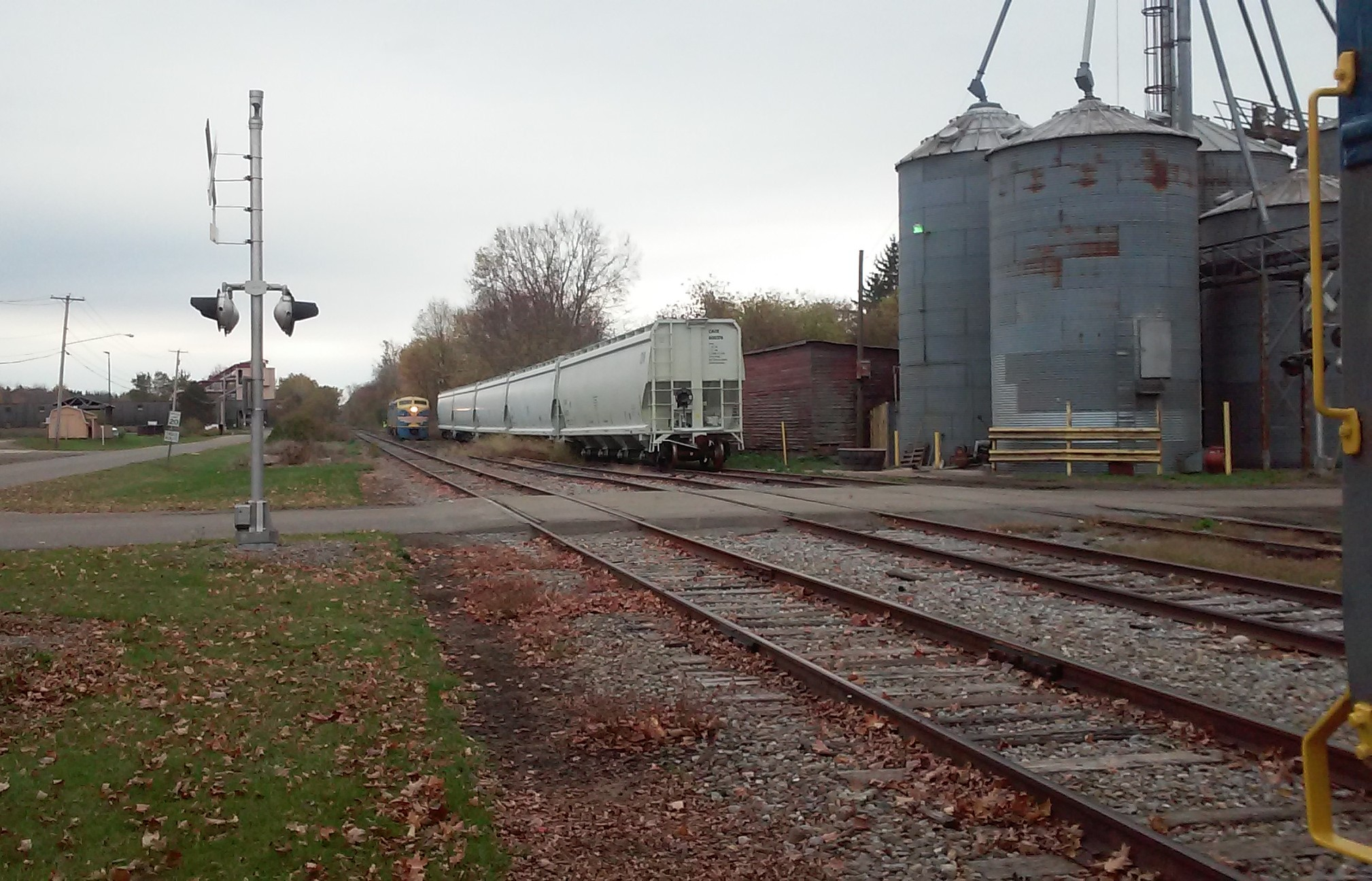
NYLE 6758 switching tracks in preparation to couple to passenger cars in South Dayton, NY.

The right-of-way was damaged by the 2009 flooding of the Cattaraugus Creek, resulting in passenger service on the New York & Lake Erie Railroad being suspended until late 2012. As of late 2016, the New York and Lake Erie offers a variety of excursion opportunities throughout the year with most trips ending in either Dayton or South Dayton and occasionally Cherry Creek. Operations South of Cherry Creek remain out of service.

The NYLE was awarded a NYSDOT grant in June 2016 totaling $732,768 to be put towards a rail rehabilitation project that the railroad will embark on between South Dayton and Cherry Creek. The goal is to replace a switch at the NY&LE's southern end at Waterboro and restore full rail service between Gowanda and Jamestown by 2019, then Buffalo (through a connecting railroad) by 2020. Despite the objections of Cattaraugus County (who accused the railroad of proposing the project as a grant-money scam), the state and city of Jamestown announced its support for a feasibility study for the project in May 2017. As of June 2018, restoration plans for the southern portion of the NYLE remain in the planning stages.

In August 2023, the NY&LE announced a proposal to introduce rail bike service on the portion of the Dayton-Cattaraugus fork that remains usable. A separate rail bike service has proposed using the unusable portion of the rail, but this would require substantial renovations. Revolution Rail Company took over the Cattaraugus end of the rail for its rail bike service beginning in May 2026.

== See also ==
- New York & Lake Erie Railroad
