= Western New York and Pennsylvania Railroad (2001) =

Short-line railroad that operates freight trains in New York and Pennsylvania

Overview
- Headquarters: Falconer, New York
- Reporting mark: WNYP
- Locale: Northwest Pennsylvania and Western New York
- Dates of operation: 2001–present
- Predecessor: Western New York and Pennsylvania Railway

Technical
- Track gauge: 4 ft 8 1/2 in (1,435 mm) standard gauge
- Length: 330 miles (530 km)

The Western New York and Pennsylvania Railroad (reporting mark WNYP) is a short-line railroad that operates freight trains in Western New York and Northwest Pennsylvania. The company is controlled by the Livonia, Avon and Lakeville Railroad, with which it does not connect. It started operations in 2001 on the Southern Tier Extension, a former Erie Railroad line between Hornell, New York and Corry, Pennsylvania, owned by the public Chautauqua, Cattaraugus, Allegany and Steuben Southern Tier Extension Railroad Authority (STERA).

Through acquisitions and leases, the line in Pennsylvania was extended from Corry to Meadville in 2002 and to Oil City in 2006. In 2007, the WNY&P leased and sub-leased portions of the north–south Buffalo Line, a former Pennsylvania Railroad line mostly built by a predecessor of the defunct Western New York and Pennsylvania Railway. The two lines cross at Olean, NY.

== Operations ==
The WNY&P operates a system centered on Olean, New York, where it operates the ex-Erie yard just west of the crossing of its two main lines. The Southern Tier Extension heads east to the Norfolk Southern Railway's (NS's) Southern Tier Line at Hornell and west to NS at Meadville, with a branch continuing to the Oil City area. The WNY&P's segment of the Buffalo Line stretches north to Machias, a junction with the Buffalo and Pittsburgh Railroad (B&P), and south over Keating Summit, Pennsylvania to Driftwood, Pennsylvania, which the B&P and NS both serve. Other connections include the B&P at Salamanca, NY and Corry, PA, the New York and Lake Erie Railroad (NYLE) at Waterboro, NY and the Oil Creek and Titusville Railroad at Rouseville, PA. The NYLE connection has been out of service for decades; as it stands, the NYLE stops at a dead end several miles north of the WNY&P track. The NYLE has expressed interest in rehabilitating the line and restoring the connection.

Since 2001, when the WNY&P began operation of the Southern Tier Extension from Corry, PA to Hornell, NY per a sub-lease with Norfolk Southern, local service levels have increased from less than one to several trains per day. NS retains overhead trackage rights and for several years operated daily coal trains over the line from Southwestern Pennsylvania to Upstate New York and New England. WNY&P business on the Buffalo Line includes hauling coal from Emporium, PA (north of Driftwood) to the Samuel A. Carlson Electric Generating Station in Jamestown, NY (west of Olean). By 2012, all coal trains had ceased to run over the WNYP due to the closure or conversion of coal-fired power plants in the Northeastern United States.

== History ==
The New York and Erie Railroad completed its line between Piermont, NY and Dunkirk, NY via Hornell, NY and Salamanca, NY in 1851. The 1852 completion of the Hornell-Buffalo Buffalo and New York City Railroad turned the Hornell-Dunkirk line into a branch. A line extending west from Salamanca was completed by the Atlantic and Great Western Railroad (A&GW) to Jamestown, NY in 1860, Corry, PA in 1861, Meadville, PA in 1862, and into Ohio in 1863, finally reaching Dayton, OH in 1864. The same company opened a branch from Meadville via Franklin, OH to Oil City, PA by 1866. Except for a realignment east of Corry, built by the Columbus and Erie Railroad by 1908, the A&GW eventually became the main line of the Erie Railroad to Chicago. It was retained by Conrail in 1976, though it ceased to be a primary route for through trains, and the portions between Corry and Jamestown and between Olean, NY and Hornell were taken out of service in 1991.

The Interstate Commerce Commission (ICC) authorized Conrail to abandon part of this line, which it called the Meadville Line, between Corry and Meadville in August, 1994, effective at the end of the month. The on-line municipalities of Corry, Union City, PA, Cambridge Springs, PA, Saegertown, PA, and Meadville filed an offer of financial assistance that month to purchase the line for its net liquidation value of $2.9 million, and the abandonment authority was rescinded. Through the newly created Northwest Pennsylvania Rail Authority they acquired the property on October 31, 1995, after some delay, for operation by the Oil Creek and Titusville Railroad (OCTR), and operations began soon after. But the courts ruled in August 1996 that the ICC had no authority to force the sale, since they had authorized abandonment again in April, 1995, and so the line was to pass back to Conrail, which wanted to keep it from falling into the hands of a competitor. In the midst of talks between Conrail and the two companies that were buying its assets, CSX Transportation and the Norfolk Southern Railway, the authority reached an agreement with Conrail in June, 1997, allowing it to keep the line.

Norfolk Southern (NS), successor to Conrail's lines in the immediate area, agreed in June, 1998 to place the Corry-Hornell "Southern Tier Extension" back in service, in exchange for certain financial incentives. This June, 1998 Memorandum of Understanding (MOU) was memorialized in the Surface Transportation Board's record of Decision in July, 1998. The New York Legislature then created the Chautauqua, Cattaraugus, Allegany, and Steuben Southern Tier Extension Railroad Authority (STERA) in June, 2000 in order to acquire the New York portion of the line and lease it back to NS. This was done in February, 2001, and on April 23, the newly created WNY&P, a subsidiary of the Livonia, Avon and Lakeville Railroad, sub-leased the line from Norfolk Southern and began operating the line. Except for a short segment near the Buffalo Line crossing at Olean, which NS did not sub-lease to WNY&P (but for which Norfolk Southern did provide overhead trackage rights to WNY&P), the WNY&P sub-leased the line from Corry, PA to Hornell, NY from Norfolk Southern.

Looking to the west, the WNY&P acquired the Corry-Meadville line from the Northwest Pennsylvania Rail Authority in January, 2002, for $1 and the cancellation of the authority's $1.9 million debt. The authority had borrowed the money in the 1990s from NORPA, then a subsidiary of the Delaware Otsego Corporation, to pay for the acquisition in conjunction with $1 million from the state. (Delaware Otsego financed the purchase to preserve a possible connection between its subsidiary New York, Susquehanna and Western Railway and CSX Transportation in the case of a Norfolk Southern Railway/Conrail merger.) The WNY&P bought NORPA in 2001, allowing it to cancel the debt. At the same time as it acquired the line, the WNY&P replaced OCTR as operator. Thanks to state and federal funding, the WNY&P began repairing the out-of-service parts of the line in August, 2002, and by fall 2003 it had been sufficiently rehabilitated to allow full operations. In its agreement with WNY&P in which it sub-leased operating rights to WNY&P for the portion of the line from Corry, PA to Hornell, NY, NS retained overhead trackage rights for that portion of the line, allowing NS trains to enter or exit that portion of the Southern Tier Extension operated by the WNY&P at either Hornell (Southern Tier Line), Olean (Buffalo Line), Corry (Buffalo and Pittsburgh Railroad trackage rights), and Meadville (Meadville Line). This provided a bypass around Buffalo, NY for freight including Upstate New York- and New England-bound Monongahela coal.

In December, 2005, the WNY&P expanded further with the lease from NS of the ex-Erie Franklin Secondary and associated lines between Meadville, PA and Rouseville, PA— all just north of Oil City. This connected the WNY&P directly to industries in the Franklin, PA-Oil City, PA area, and indirectly to Titusville, PA via the Oil Creek and Titusville Railroad. By the end of 2006, NS decided to discontinue operations north of Driftwood, Pennsylvania on the Buffalo Line, a line that the Pennsylvania Railroad had acquired through its control of the former Western New York and Pennsylvania Railway and Philadelphia and Erie Railroad. The line north of Machias, NY would be leased to the Buffalo and Pittsburgh Railroad, which then had trackage rights, and the remainder between Machias and Driftwood was to become a WNY&P operation. STERA acquired the line between Machias and the NY-PA state line in February, 2007, appending this portion of the line to the arrangement specified in its June, 1998 MOU with Norfolk Southern. STERA then leased the line between Machias and the state line back to Norfolk Southern, which in turn sub-leased it to WNY&P. Norfolk Southern leased the line from the NY-PA state line to Driftwood, PA directly to WNY&P. On August 4, the WNY&P took over operations between Machias and Driftwood. The sub-lease of the Machias to NY-PA state line portion of the Buffalo Line also included the sub-lease of the small portion of the Southern Tier Extension near the crossing at Olean (the "Olean Rail Yard"), and installed WNY&P as operator of a short branch to Farmers Valley, Pennsylvania. The latter had been built, in part, by the Pittsburg, Shawmut and Northern Railroad, and acquired by the Pennsylvania Railroad after the PSNR ceased operations in 1947.

In 2009, the Buffalo Line was used to film scenes in the 2010 film Unstoppable. Filming took place over three months during the daylight hours while the railroad ran its regular services at night. "It stretched our assets to the limit," said Carl Belke, the railroad's chief operating officer. "We had all hands on deck."

In 2019, the WNY&P purchased eight GE AC6000CW locomotives from Progress Rail Leasing. These locomotives were originally built in the 1990s for CSX and allowed it to sideline aging Alco/MLW six-axled locomotives it had used mainly on trains to Emporium/Driftwood and to Salamanca. The six engines among the eight that were serviceable now comprise its heavy-haul fleet while smaller Alco-design engines handle lighter duties.

On March 9, 2024, the railroad announced it would be discontinuing service on the former Erie Railroad line between Saegertown, PA and Jamestown, NY, due to low traffic volumes. That same year, 4 of the ex-CSX AC6000CWs were returned to GECX.
