= Annin Township, Pennsylvania =

Township in Pennsylvania, United States

Coordinates: 41°53′00″N 78°14′29″W

- Township
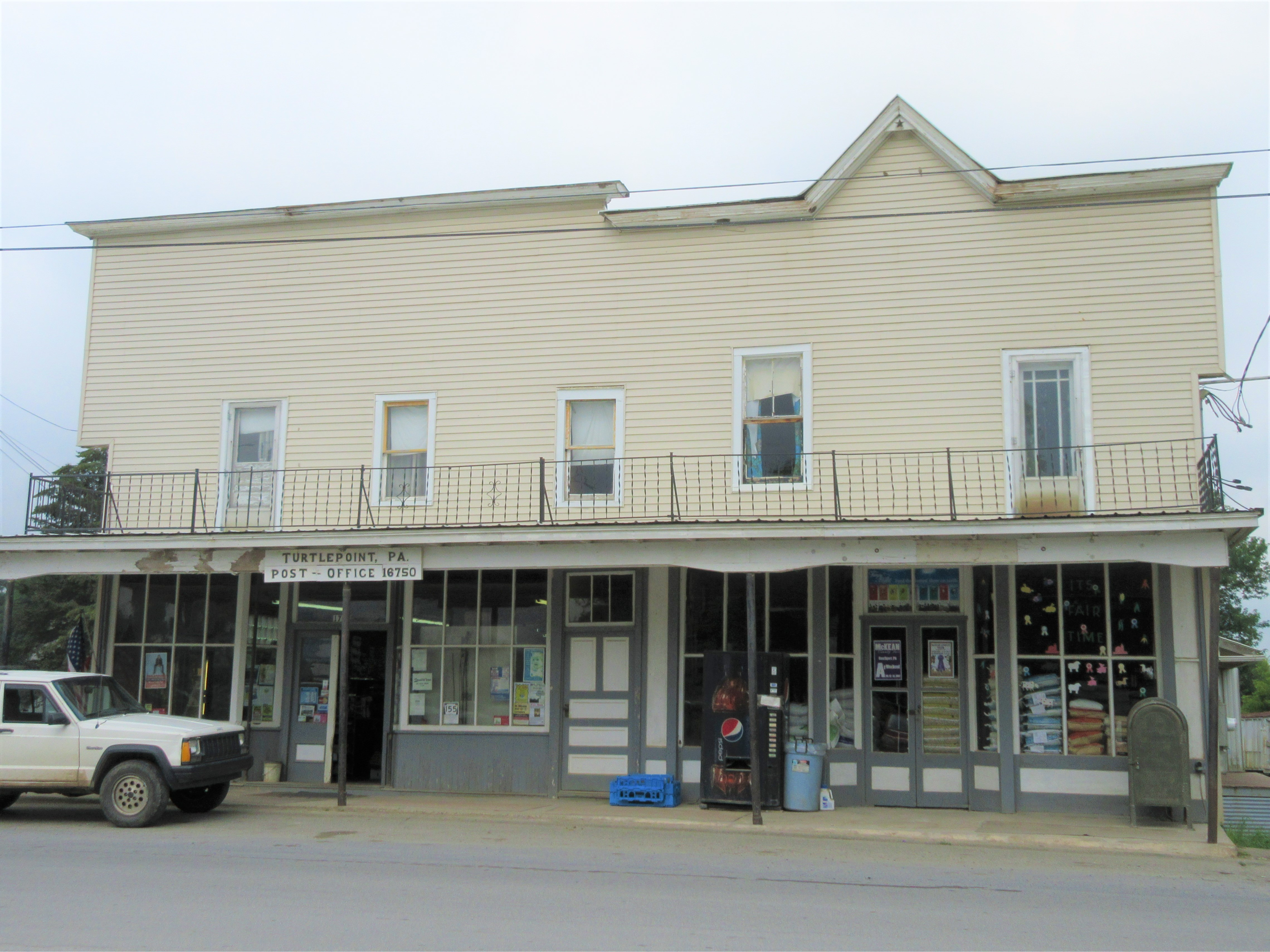
- Turtlepoint post office and Carlson's Store in Annin Township

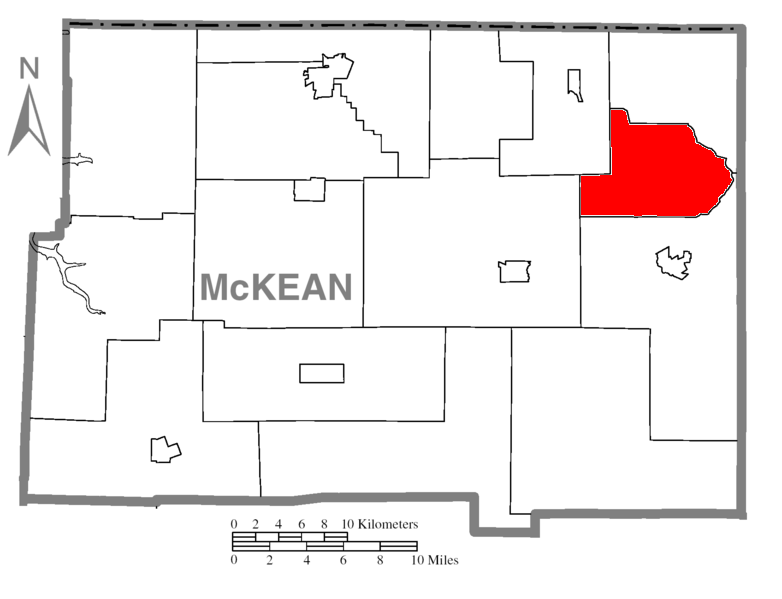
- Location in McKean County

- Location of McKean County in Pennsylvania
- Country: United States
- State: Pennsylvania
- County: McKean
- Settled: 1836
- Incorporated: 1857

Area
  - Total: 33.24 sq mi (86.1 km^{2})
  - Land: 33.12 sq mi (85.8 km^{2})
  - Water: 0.12 sq mi (0.31 km^{2})

Population (2020)
  - Total: 709
  - Estimate (2022): 703
  - Density: 21.41/sq mi (8.27/km^{2})
- Time zone: UTC-5 (Eastern (EST))
  - Summer (DST): UTC-4 (EDT)
- ZIP Codes: 16750 (Turtlepoint); 16731 (Eldred); 16743 (Port Allegany); 16749 (Smethport)
- Area code: 814
- FIPS code: 42-083-02576

Annin Township is a township in McKean County, Pennsylvania, United States. As of the 2020 census, it had a population of 709.

== Geography ==
The township is in eastern McKean County. It is bordered to the north and northeast by Ceres Township, to the northwest by Eldred Township, to the southwest by Keating Township, and to the south and southeast by Liberty Township. The community of Turtlepoint is in the southwest part of the township, and has a post office with ZIP Code 16750. Pennsylvania Route 155 passes through Turtlepoint, leading southeast 5 miles (8 km) to Port Allegany and north-northwest 7 miles (11 km) to Eldred. Smethport, the McKean county seat, is 9 miles (14 km) southwest of Turtlepoint via local roads.

According to the U.S. Census Bureau, Annin Township has a total area of 33.2 square miles (86 km^{2}), of which 0.01 square miles (0.0 km^{2}), or 0.35%, are water. It is the smallest township in McKean County. The Allegheny River, 32 miles (51 km) downriver from its source in Potter County, crosses the southwestern part of the township, passing southwest of Turtlepoint. The township is drained by tributaries of the Allegheny such as Twomile Creek, Annin Creek, Rock Run, and Newell Creek from the northeast, and Open Brook from the south.

== Demographics ==
Historical population
Census	Pop.	Note	%±
1870	760		—
1880	1,080		42.1%
1890	1,188		10.0%
1900	914		−23.1%
1910	716		−21.7%
1920	605		−15.5%
1930	552		−8.8%
1940	631		14.3%
1950	659		4.4%
1960	682		3.5%
1970	708		3.8%
1990	773		—
2000	835		8.0%
2010	694		−16.9%
2020	709		2.2%
2022 (est.)	703		−0.8%
U.S. Decennial Census

As of the census of 2000, there were 835 people, 311 households, and 236 families residing in the township. The population density was 24.9 people per square mile (9.6/km^{2}). There were 399 housing units at an average density of 11.9/sq mi (4.6/km^{2}). The racial makeup of the township was 98.20% White, 0.24% African American, 1.08% Native American, 0.12% Asian, and 0.36% from two or more races. Hispanic or Latino of any race were 0.12% of the population.

There were 311 households, out of which 36.7% had children under the age of 18 living with them, 62.4% were married couples living together, 7.7% had a female householder with no husband present, and 23.8% were non-families. 20.6% of all households were made up of individuals, and 6.8% had someone living alone who was 65 years of age or older. The average household size was 2.68 and the average family size was 3.05.

In the township the population was spread out, with 27.4% under the age of 18, 6.6% from 18 to 24, 28.6% from 25 to 44, 23.8% from 45 to 64, and 13.5% who were 65 years of age or older. The median age was 37 years. For every 100 females, there were 111.9 males. For every 100 females age 18 and over, there were 113.4 males.

The median income for a household in the township was $37,039, and the median income for a family was $42,569. Males had a median income of $35,000 versus $22,222 for females. The per capita income for the township was $15,703. About 9.3% of families and 11.1% of the population were below the poverty line, including 12.2% of those under age 18 and 6.1% of those age 65 or over.

== Notable person ==
- Susan “Busty Heart” Sykes, big-bust model and strip club proprietor
