= Genesee Junction, New York =

Coordinates: 43°05′54″N 77°41′10″W

In the early days of Rochester railroading, Genesee Junction was the name given to the interchange between the West Shore Railroad and the Pennsylvania Railroad in Chili, NY. However, after the PRR shut down its Rochester Branch following its merger with the New York Central, the name "Genesee Junction" moved west to the neighboring interchange between the West Shore (Penn Central by this point) and the Baltimore and Ohio Railroad. This interchange, formerly known as West Shore Junction, has retained the name Genesee Junction to this day.

== Notes ==
Genesee Junction, despite its status as a hamlet, has no roads or buildings save for those found in the Genesee Junction Yard. In fact, the yard, a three-track switching yard used by CSX, the Livonia, Avon and Lakeville Railroad and the Rochester and Southern Railroad, makes up the entire hamlet.

In the years prior to the Conrail break-up, the LAL was forbidden to interchange directly with the RSR due to a "paper barrier" created by Conrail's ownership of the yard that made direct interchange between the two shortlines all but impossible, allowing Conrail to act as the "middle man". When CSX took over the ex-CR lines in the Rochester area in 1998, they attempted to maintain this paper barrier. However, in the Surface Transportation Board decision for the split of Conrail, the LAL was granted trackage rights through the yard to directly interchange with the Rochester Southern and Norfolk Southern. This eliminated the paper barrier that had been created by Conrail. To this day, CSX still owns the yard, interchanging with the LAL; however, the LAL has trackage rights to Brooks Ave yard, where they can directly interchange with the RS.

The only section of the PRR Rochester Branch still in existence today can be found in Genesee Junction. This stub of track, branching off CSX's West Shore Branch but owned by the RSR, services three online customers. The remainder of the PRR branch from downtown Rochester into the Southern Tier has become the Genesee Valley Greenway trail.
