= American Rock Salt Company =

American rock salt mining company in New York

- Type: Private LLC
- Founded: January 31, 1997
- Founder: Gunther K. Buerman; Joseph G. Bucci; Neil L. Cohen
- Headquarters: Mine: 5520 NY-63; Mt. Morris, NY 14510 HQ: 3846 Retsof Rd. Retsof, NY 14539
- Products: Highway deicing rock salt, bulk and bagged salt
- Website: americanrocksalt.com

American Rock Salt Company, LLC (known as The American Rock Salt Company or ARSC) is a US mining company formed in 1997 which operates an underground halite mine Livingston County, NY.

Mining an enormous pocket of left behind by an ancient sea, The ARSC Hampton Corners mine is presently the largest active mine of its kind in the US. As of 2017 mine produces up to 4.3 million tons of salt per year.

== History ==
The company was founded on January 31, 1997 following the closure of the nearby Retsof salt mine as the result of a mine collapse, in order to enter into an asset purchase agreement with owner Akzo Nobel Salt, Inc. to acquire its assets and development rights for the Hampton Corners mine site.

The divestiture of the Hampton Corners rights was also addressed in a 1997 U.S. Department of Justice antitrust action.

Salt mining in the region dates back to the 1880s with the opening of the Retsof Salt Mine in nearby Retsof, New York. Development of the Hampton Corners site was originally conceived in 1969 by the International Salt Mining Company.

Following the closure of the Akzo Nobel salt mine at Retsof, local business and legal figures Gunther K. Buerman, Joseph G. Bucci, Neil L. Cohen, and Charles "Bud" Van Arsdale set out to establish a new mining operation.

Construction at Hampton Corners began in November 1998. The company made its first truckload salt sale in January 2000 and completed construction of the mine in December 2001. In 2019, New York State approved a 1,700-acre underground expansion at the Hampton Corners mine to extend its operating life.

== Operations ==
American Rock Salt produces bulk and bagged rock salt primarily for highway deicing across the northeastern United States, with peak demand occurring during winter weather months. Its 1,433-foot mineshaft is located at Hampton Corners along New York State Route 63 in Livingston County, with bagging and administrative operations in Retsof, New York.

Rail freight service to the operation is provided by the Rochester and Southern Railroad, a subsidiary of Genesee & Wyoming Inc.
