= New Castle Branch (Pennsylvania Railroad) =

The New Castle Branch was a rail line owned and operated by the Pennsylvania Railroad in the U.S. state of Pennsylvania. The line ran from New Castle north to Stoneboro (later Mercer), and is now entirely abandoned. At its south end, the line intersected the Erie and Pittsburgh Branch and Mahoningtown Branch. When the New Castle Branch ended at Stoneboro, the PRR had trackage rights east along the New York Central Railroad's Stoneboro Branch to Oil City and the Allegheny Branch, Chautauqua Branch, and Salamanca Branch.

The New Castle Branch (and the Wolf Creek Branch, a short spur of it) was the only part of the Western New York and Pennsylvania Railway operated by the Pennsylvania Company as part of the Lines West of Pittsburgh rather than by the Pennsylvania Railroad as part of the Lines East of Pittsburgh. The Pennsylvania Company also operated the trackage rights from Stoneboro to Oil City.

== History ==
The New Castle and Franklin Railroad opened the line from New Castle to Mercer Junction in 1873 and to Stoneboro in 1874. The NC&F was sold at foreclosure and reorganized in 1881 as the New Castle and Oil City Railroad, which was merged into the Oil City and Chicago Railroad and then the Buffalo, New York and Philadelphia Railroad in 1882. The BNY&P was reorganized as the Western New York and Pennsylvania Railroad in 1887, and again as the Western New York and Pennsylvania Railway in 1895. The Pennsylvania Railroad leased the WNY&P in 1900, including the New Castle Branch, which was immediately subleased to the Pennsylvania Company.

The lease (and other Pennsylvania Company leases) was returned to the PRR in 1918. Passenger service was last operated over the branch on June 9, 1931, and the line north of Houston Junction (near Mercer) was abandoned in 1938.
