= Allegheny and Eastern Railroad =

Railroad in Pennsylvania

Overview
- Headquarters: Warren, Pennsylvania
- Reporting mark: ALY
- Dates of operation: 1992–2004
- Predecessor: Allegheny Railroad
- Successor: Buffalo and Pittsburgh Railroad

Technical
- Track gauge: 4 ft 8 1/2 in (1,435 mm) standard gauge

The Allegheny and Eastern Railroad (reporting mark ALY) was a shortline railroad operating in Pennsylvania, owned by Genesee & Wyoming Inc. It is now operated by the Buffalo and Pittsburgh Railroad.

Originally named the Allegheny Railroad, Genesee & Wyoming Inc. purchased the company in the early 1990s and renamed it the Allegheny and Eastern Railroad. The ALY's headquarters were located in Warren, Pennsylvania. Its main customer was International Paper in Erie, Pennsylvania. The railroad was merged into the Buffalo and Pittsburgh Railroad, another Genesee & Wyoming Inc. railroad, in 2004. Simultaneously, a new company with the same name was created to purchase the property, which is now operated by the BPRR. (The ALY also acquired the residual common carrier obligation on the lines.) All motive power that remained on ALY property by the time it was merged into BPRR was relettered "BPRR" on the cab below the numbers, and still remain in ALY paint.

Allegheny and Eastern motive power
ALY number	BPRR number	Model	Livery	Notes
101	301	GP40	light blue and orange ALY paint	Rebuilt as a GP40-2 to BPRR 3021
102	302	GP40	dark blue and orange ALY paint	Retired and sold to Larrys Truck Electric (LTEX)
103	303	CF7	dark blue and orange ALY paint	Sold to Louisiana and Delta Railroad (LDRR) as number 1505
104	304	CF7	dark blue and orange ALY paint	Sold to Louisiana and Delta Railroad (LDRR) as number 1506
105	305	GP35	dark blue and orange ALY paint	Rebuilt as a road slug to BPRR 120
106	306	GP35	orange and black GWI paint	sold to Ferrocarriles Chiapas-Mayab, Mexico, as number 201B (slug)
