= Allegheny Railroad =

Defunct railroad company operating in northwestern Pennsylvania

Overview
- Parent company: International Paper
- Headquarters: Warren, Pennsylvania
- Reporting mark: ALY
- Dates of operation: 1985–1992
- Predecessor: Johnsonburg, Kane, Warren and Irvine Railroad
- Successor: Allegheny and Eastern Railroad

Technical
- Track gauge: 1,435 mm (4 ft 8 1/2 in)
- Length: 147.1 miles (236.7 km)

The Allegheny Railroad (reporting mark ALY) was an American railroad company operating in northwestern Pennsylvania.

The Allegheny Railroad began operations on September 3, 1985. It operated 147.1 miles (236.7 km) of line between milepost 2.8 located at Erie, Pennsylvania and milepost 149.9 located at Emporium, Pennsylvania.

To create the new railroad, five individual segments were assembled: The first, from Erie to Irvine was purchased from Conrail. The second, from Irvine to Warren from the Irvine, Warren, Kane & Johnsonburg Railroad. The third, from Warren to Kane from the Pennsylvania Department of Transportation. The fourth, from Kane to Johnsonburg, from the Irvine, Warren, Kane & Johnsonburg Railroad. The fifth and final segment, from Johnsonburg to Emporium, was purchased from Conrail.

Hammermill Paper was the sole owner. Hammermill used the line to ship product between its plants in Erie and Lock Haven. Hammermill was purchased by International Paper in 1986.

The Allegheny and Eastern Railroad, a subsidiary of Genesee & Wyoming Inc., purchased the railroad on October 31, 1992. The Allegheny and Eastern Railroad was merged into the Buffalo and Pittsburgh Railroad another subsidiary of Genesee & Wyoming Inc. on January 1, 2004.

== Locomotive roster ==
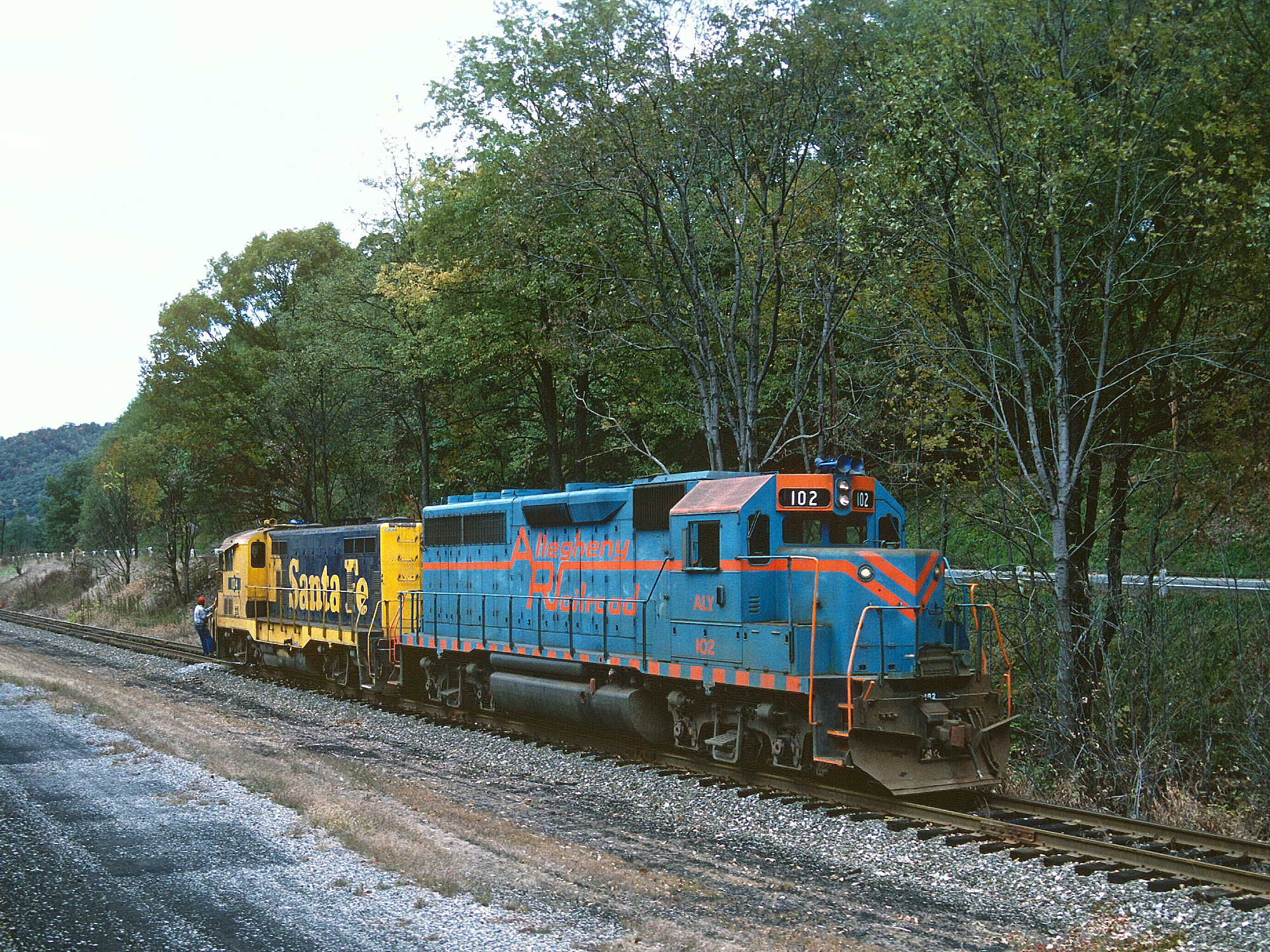
Allegheny RR 102 and 104 on CR at Emporium, PA on October 3, 1987

| # | Model | Power | Builder | Year | C/N | Notes |
|---|---|---|---|---|---|---|
| 101 | GP40 | 3,000 hp (2,200 kW) | EMD | 1968 | 34706 | ex Conrail 3242, née Penn Central 3242, Renumbered ALY 301 |
| 102 | GP40 | 3,000 hp (2,200 kW) | EMD | 1968 | 34715 | ex Conrail 3251, née Penn Central 3251, Renumbered ALY 302 |
| 103 | CF7 | 1,500 hp (1,100 kW) | EMD | 1953 | 18911 | AT&SF 2590, rebuilt from EMD F7A 269-L 12/1972 Renumbered ALY 303 |
| 104 | CF7 | 1,500 hp (1,100 kW) | EMD | 1953 | 18911 | AT&SF 2521, rebuilt from EMD F7A 264-L 5/1974 Renumbered ALY 304 |
| 105 | GP35 | 2,500 hp (1,900 kW) | EMD | 29171 | 1964 | ex Union Pacific 743 Renumbered ALY 305 |
| 106 | GP35 | 2,500 hp (1,900 kW) | EMD | 29176 | 1964 | ex Union Pacific 748 Renumbered ALY 306 |
| 301 | GP40 | 1,500 hp (1,100 kW) | EMD | 1968 | 34706 | Renumbered from ALY 101 |
| 302 | GP40 | 1,500 hp (1,100 kW) | EMD | 1968 | 34715 | Renumbered from ALY 102 |

== Mileage ==
=== Main line ===
| Location | Distance from Erie | Siding Capacity |
|---|---|---|
| ERIE | 0.0 | - |
| ERIE (OD YD) | 2.2 | YD |
| Begin ALYRR | 2.8 | - |
| WATERFORD | 18.4 | 5 |
| UNION CITY | 26.1 | 35 |
| LOVELL | 34.4 | - |
| MS CORRY (CR) | 37.1 | - |
| IRVINETON | 59.9 | 15 |
| PENLEC | 65.1 | - |
| WARREN | 65.8 | YD |
| BRIDGE | 67.0 | - |
| CLARENDON | 72.5 | - |
| CLARE | 72.6 | 10 |
| TIONA | 75.3 | 3 |
| SHEFFIELD | 78.9 | 10 |
| ROYSTONE | 81.8 | 7 |
| N. TIMBERLAND | 92.5 | 55 |
| KANE | 94.7 | 35 |
| SERGEANT | 98.9 | 10 |
| JOHNSONBURG | 110.2 | - |
| BURG | 110.5 | 75 |
| RIDGEWAY | 117.9 | 25 |
| ST. MARYS | 128.3 | 75 |
| EMPORIUM | 149.9 | 25 |
| JN (CR) | 150 | YD |

=== North Warren Branch ===
| Location | Distance from Junction | Siding Capacity |
|---|---|---|
| WARREN (YD) | 0.0 | - |
| North WARREN | 2.3 | 2 |

=== Refinery Branch ===
| Location | Distance from Junction | Siding Capacity |
|---|---|---|
| BRIDGE | 0.0 | - |
| STRUTHERS | 1.5 | 95 |

=== Grandview Branch ===
| Location | Distance from Junction | Siding Capacity |
|---|---|---|
| ST. MARYS (YD) | 0.0 | YD |
| AIRCO | 0.8 | 8 |
| GRANDVIEW | 1.8 | 15 |
