= Busty Heart =

American television personality & actress (born 1961)

- Born: Susan Sykes; May 9, 1961 (age 65); Boston, Massachusetts, U.S.
- Modeling information
- Height: 5 ft 7 in (1.70 m)
- Website: www.bustyheart.com

Susan Sykes (born May 9, 1961) is a television personality and actress who has appeared in films such as The Dictator (alongside Sacha Baron Cohen and Sir Ben Kingsley) and Deported, as well as several television shows, who performs under the stage name Busty Heart.

== Early life and education ==
Sykes is the daughter of an IBM executive and a school teacher. Sykes worked as an assistant at an investment firm and paralegal for a large law firm before her career in the entertainment business. Sykes graduated from the Dana Hall School in Wellesley, Massachusetts. She graduated from Pine Manor College in Brookline, Massachusetts, in 1979.

== Career ==
Sykes earned the nickname "Busty Heart" in high school, by which point her oversized breasts had already developed. Her first claim to fame was as a spectator at a Boston Celtics game in 1986. She had been given free tickets to a Celtics game, which happened to be seated next to NBA prospect John Salley. As CBS's cameras spotted Salley in the crowd, Sykes shook her breasts at the camera, breaking Brent Musburger's attention and prompting him to break into laughter. Sykes, who had previously been self-conscious about her large breasts and had otherwise avoided public appearances because of them, soon “parlayed 15 seconds of fame into a 30-year-career” and became a regular at Celtics games. The Celtics won the 1986 NBA Finals and appeared in (but lost) the 1987 NBA Finals while Busty Heart was in the stands. She mostly ceased appearing at sporting events in 1990, when the St. Louis Cardinals management accused her of public lewdness after attending a Cardinals game.

She appeared on the season finale of America's Got Talent (NBC) on October 1, 2008. She also appeared on Rude Tube on Channel 4 in the United Kingdom in November 2008. Among her most famous television appearances, she was on Comedy Central's The Man Show, where she demonstrated her talent for crushing beer cans by slamming her breasts on top of them.

Busty Heart has done numerous TV shows, including Fox-TV's That's Just Wrong, The WB's Steve Harvey-hosted Steve Harvey's Big Time Challenge season finale, Endemol TV's Private Parts on Channel 5 in England, truTV's World's Dumbest, Bravo TV's Outrageous and Contagious Viral Videos, Fuji TV Tokyo Japan "2006 Bakademy Awards", E!'s Talk Soup, and 2007 Spike TV MANswers.

E! named a Busty Heart clip the #14 best video clip of 2005. On July 1, 2008, she demonstrated her "talents" on the third season of America's Got Talent, and received unanimous "No" votes. However, during 2010's German talent show Das Supertalent, she received all "yes" votes from the judges and even reached the semi-final round,(Top 40 out of 41.000 auditioners) where she missed the final because of the audience's voting. She later performed in Got Talent in other countries, such as Croatia, Czech Republic, Georgia and France

Busty Heart appeared in the film The Dictator; she plays the role of Etra, one of the titular dictator's bodyguards who uses her breasts as weapons. She appeared in the 2017 movie Deported as Paul's wife. She has also appeared in the E! television series Botched.

Since 1996, she has operated Busty Heart's Place, a strip club located in Turtlepoint, Pennsylvania.

== Lawsuit ==
In July 1996, Bennie Casson filed a $100,000 lawsuit against Busty Heart; he alleged that she had slammed her breasts into his head during a strip club performance, aggravating a previous neck injury of his. The lawsuit was dismissed in 1999 after Casson was unable to find legal representation; he died by suicide soon afterward.
