= Philadelphia and Erie Railroad =

Railway line in the United States of America

Overview
- Headquarters: Philadelphia
- Locale: Pennsylvania, U.S.
- Dates of operation: 1837–1907
- Successor: Pennsylvania Railroad

Technical
- Track gauge: 4 ft 8 1/2 in (1,435 mm) standard gauge
- Length: 307 miles (494 km)

The Philadelphia and Erie Railroad was a railroad that operated in the U.S. state of Pennsylvania between 1861 and 1907. It was subsequently merged into the Pennsylvania Railroad (PRR).

== History ==
Sunbury and Erie Rail Road and connections, 1850s

The Sunbury and Erie Railroad Company (also known as the Erie and Sunbury Railroad) was chartered by the Commonwealth of Pennsylvania in 1837, to build a rail line connecting towns between Sunbury and Erie, Pennsylvania. Due to financial problems, the company did not begin construction until the state passed enabling legislation, which including reducing tax assessments, in 1852. By December 1854, 28.5 miles (45.9 km) of track were completed between Milton (a junction with the Catawissa Railroad) and Williamsport. The line reached Sunbury in 1855, a total of 40 miles (64 km). The company continued to experience financial problems, exacerbated by the Panic of 1857. The tracks reached Lock Haven in 1859. To speed completion of the line, the Sunbury & Erie also started building towards the southeast from Erie. That portion of the line reached Warren, a distance of 66 miles, by 1859; little construction occurred in 1860 amid the politics leading to the American Civil War.

In 1861, the Pennsylvania General Assembly passed additional legislation to strengthen the company's financial position, and changed the company name to the Philadelphia and Erie Railroad (P&E). Other, related legislation authorized various railroad companies to lease the lines of other companies, and the Pennsylvania Railroad (PRR) entered into a 999-year lease with the Philadelphia & Erie in 1862. That same year the PRR assumed control of the P&E. Labor shortages due to the Civil War further delayed construction.

The main line was completed to Erie in October 1864. The New York Times suggested that the railroad would be a major route connecting trade for petroleum between northwestern Pennsylvania and Philadelphia. The Erie Union Station opened on October 1, 1865.

The P&E opened a large coal transfer terminal at its Lake Erie terminus in 1866. In 1867, the pier at Erie was expanded to handle ore shipments from the midwest. Despite these improvements, the P&E did not thrive, as it faced strong competition from the New York Central Railroad. Over the next three decades the P&E also experienced serious setbacks due to several major floods, storms, a bridge fire, and various operational accidents.

The P&E was formally merged with the PRR in May 1907.

The P&E and its successor (PRR) operated a significant 25-track freight classification yard and repair facility at Renovo, Pennsylvania, from 1866 until 1968. From the 1920s onward, more and more work was relocated from Renovo to Altoona, but Renovo continued as a significant repair and car-building facility through World War II. After the war, employment steadily dropped from a war-time high of nearly 2,000 to under 250 by 1966.

After the dissolution of the PRR into Conrail, parts of the railroad west of Emporium were sold off to other entities before being reunited under the Allegheny Railroad; subsequent mergers resulted in the road now being a branch the Buffalo and Pittsburgh Railroad, with the exception of an abandoned portion from St. Marys to Emporium. East of Emporium, the road is now part of the main line of Norfolk Southern from Harrisburg to Buffalo.
