= Western New York and Pennsylvania Railway (1895–1955) =

Railway in Pennsylvania

Western New York & Pennsylvania Railway

Overview
- Headquarters: Philadelphia, Pennsylvania
- Locale: Emporium, Pennsylvania and Mahoningtown, Pennsylvania to Buffalo, New York and Rochester, New York
- Dates of operation: 1895–1955
- Predecessor: Western New York Railway and Northwestern Pennsylvania Railway
- Successor: Penndel Company; Western New York and Pennsylvania Railroad

Technical
- Track gauge: 4 ft 8 1/2 in (1,435 mm) standard gauge
- Length: 586.145 miles (943.309 km)

The Western New York and Pennsylvania Railway (earlier, the Western New York and Pennsylvania Railroad) was a railroad that operated independently from 1887 to 1900 in the U.S. states of New York and Pennsylvania.

The Western New York and Pennsylvania Railroad was incorporated in 1887 from the reorganization of the Buffalo, New York, and Philadelphia Railroad. It was reorganized in 1895 as the Western New York and Pennsylvania Railway. In 1900, it was acquired and leased by the Pennsylvania Railroad in 1900. It was merged into the Penndel Company in 1955.

== History ==
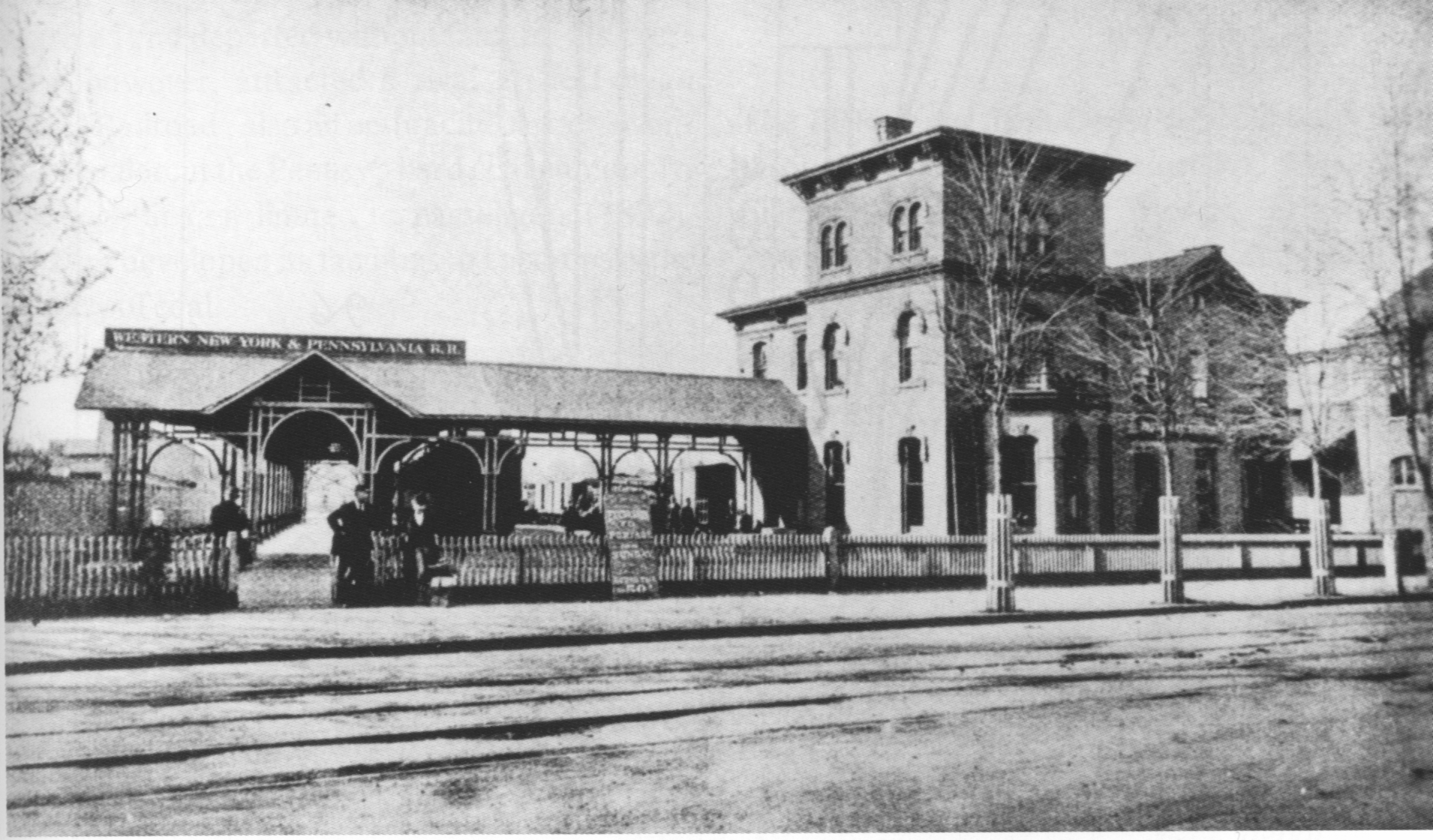
Destroyed in 1968 in the name of Rochester's urban renewal, this station served first the WNY&PRR and then the Pennsy.

WNY&P System Map c. 1900

The line ran from Emporium, Pennsylvania, across the state line to Olean, Hinsdale, Cuba, Belfast, and Rochester in New York. From Belfast north, it was laid on the bed of the abandoned Genesee Valley Canal. In Rochester, a house of Italianate design was purchased on Main Street West at Trowbridge Street and converted for use as the railroad's station.

From 1895 to 1899, the company drew too little revenue to pay the bond interest. At the time, the Pennsylvania Railroad was trying to expand into western New York. On August 1, 1900, the WNY&PRY agreed to be operated by the PRR. The deal brought the WNY&PRY little profit, but it did improve revenues for the Allegheny Valley and the Philadelphia and Erie roads, so the net result was satisfactory to PRR executives.

Eventually, the Western New York and Pennsylvania Railway became the PRR's Buffalo and Allegheny Valley Division.

Various sources date the small branch from Scottsville to Garbutt from 1900 and the summer of 1907. The branch was abandoned in 1944; no trace of it remains. The Pennsy station has disappeared – even photographs of it are rare – and the railbed cannot be discerned in aerial photographs of the area south of Oatka Creek.

== See also ==
- New Castle Branch
- A short-line railway began operations in 2001 under the name Western New York and Pennsylvania Railroad, running trains on former Erie Railroad and later former WNY&P trackage.
