= Waterboro, New York =

Hamlet in New York, United States

Coordinates: 42°10′19″N 79°04′11″W

Waterboro is a hamlet in Chautauqua County, New York, United States at an elevation of 1293 ft (394 m) above sea level. Located in the northeast corner of the Town of Poland, it is now a closed railroad depot.

== History ==
The village of Waterboro itself is somewhat of a mystery. Supposedly founded by two men, Mulky and Hasbrook, in 1803. Many locals believe that at one time, before 1820, there was a community of 1200 people here. It is also believed that there were around 400 buildings including a sawmill, a gristmill, two hotels/stagecoach stops, doctor's office, post office, a school, and even a cheese factory. Many question how such a large village could simply be wiped off the map without much of a trace. Perhaps this can be explained by a fire in 1820 followed by a diphtheria epidemic, which may well have forced people to move to the nearby town of Kennedy. The summer of 1820 was very dry and there was reportedly a fire at a sawmill that quickly spread through the town. All but four houses were destroyed. After the fire was settled and the townsfolk were rebuilding diphtheria struck which caused great fear, and thus the town was never fully rebuilt. There are reportedly remnants of a Cemetery, grist mill, and cheese factory in the area. Written evidence states that there was a Waterboro Post Office established in July 15, 1827 and discontinued on July 25, 1845. This suggests that there was a fairly sizable settlement here at one point. Unfortunately most of this information is based second-hand reports, and much of it may have been fabricated by overzealous story tellers over the years since the villages disappearance. Mr. Shields, a land owner of Waterboro (circa 1971) said it best, "You may weigh and judge for yourself as to what really happened at Waterboro".

Railroad

The depot is supposed to connect the Western New York & Pennsylvania with the New York & Lake Erie, but switches and rails required for the junction to operate properly are not in usable condition and will need to be replaced; the NY&LE expected the junction to be fixed and operational by 2019 (a date that has come and gone with no developments), whereas the WNY&P's supervising authority has no plans to restore the junction (but does have plans to replace existing, worn-out rails and ties in the Waterboro area, which may or may not include preparing for a reconnection with the NYLE). The city of Jamestown announced its support for restoring service to Waterboro and have commissioned, along with the state of New York, a feasibility study for the project. Cattaraugus County has refused to take part in the study, believing the project is not feasible. As of June 2018, no progress had been made toward the reconnection of the two railroads.
