= Rochester and Southern Railroad =

Short line railroad in New York

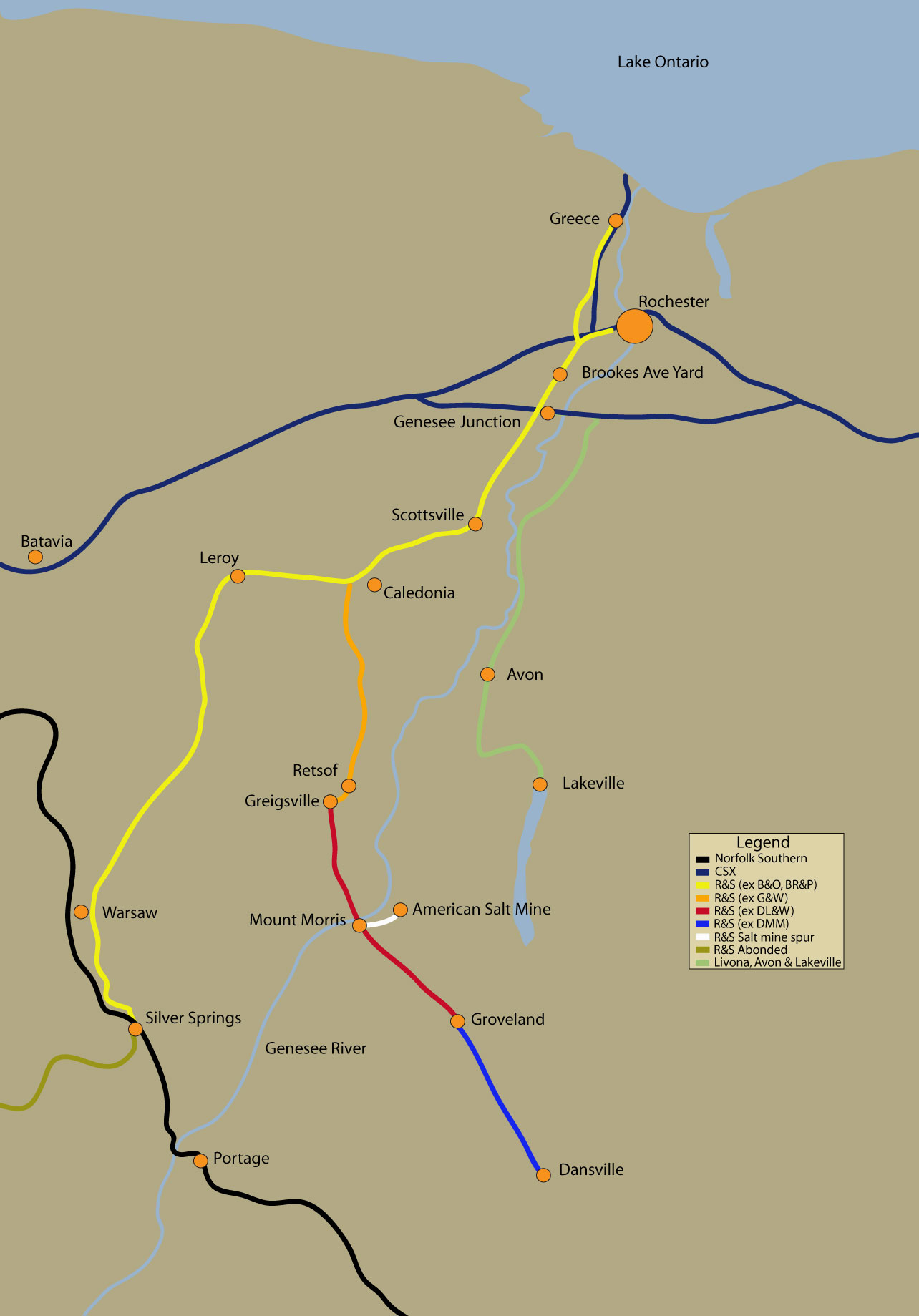
- 2007 RSR Map showing the component railroads.

Overview
- Headquarters: Rochester, New York
- Reporting mark: RSR
- Locale: New York
- Dates of operation: 1986–Present

Technical
- Track gauge: 4 ft 8 1/2 in (1,435 mm) standard gauge

Other
- Website: Rochester & Southern Railroad (RSR)

The Rochester and Southern Railroad (reporting mark RSR), a subsidiary of Genesee & Wyoming Inc., is a class III shortline that runs from the city of Rochester in Monroe County to Silver Springs, NY. The RSR started in 1986, when the B&O sold off its Buffalo and Rochester branches. The trackage was purchased by Genesee & Wyoming Inc., and split into two railroads, the Buffalo and Pittsburgh Railroad and the Rochester and Southern Railroad. The Rochester branch was scrapped from Silver Springs south to Machias, New York.

The RSR interchanges with CSX twice in Rochester, at CP-373 on the Rochester Subdivision and at Genesee Junction on CSX's West Shore Subdivision, where the RSR also interchanges with the Livonia, Avon and Lakeville Railroad, another shortline. Until 2003, the RSR also interchanged with the Genesee and Wyoming Railroad, also owned by GWI, in Caledonia as well as with Norfolk Southern's Southern Tier Line in Silver Springs. Since 2003, the G&W railroad ceased to be, and was made part of the Rochester and Southern.

== Trackage ==
In Rochester, the RSR mainline splits into two lines just north of the Chili Avenue (NY-33A) grade crossing: the Belt Line, which runs north into the heart of the city; and the Lincoln Park line, which runs parallel to the CSX mainline until the Brown Street underpass, where it turns south and crosses King and Canal Streets. After crossing Canal St., the track leads to Morse Lumber, an online customer, as well as the former entrance to the Rochester Subway, which has since been fenced off. The RSR made deliveries of paper to Gannett Newspapers through the subway until 1996 when the printing operations were moved to Greece, a suburb of Rochester. The subway has not seen use since and likely never will again, as the city of Rochester has plans in place to fill this section of the tunnel with dirt. Heading north up the belt line, the track snakes to the north, passing over the Falls Road Industrial Track, then to the east and back to the north, to parallel CSX's Charlotte Branch. Just after the Lexington Avenue underpass, a switch off the Belt Line leads down to another former connection with old subway trackage. However, unlike the connection off Canal St., this connection was built in 1976 after the city of Rochester filled in the old subway cut from Lexington Ave. to Brown St. to save on bridge maintenance. Further north, the RSR runs through the center of Kodak Park, crossing West Ridge Rd. (NY-104) before heading north to its terminus at Matthews and Fields Lumber, another online customer, on Stonewood Avenue.

Heading south from the Chili Avenue grade crossing, the first notable area of trackage is the Brooks Avenue yard. Continuing south, the RSR interchanges with CSX at Genesee Junction, where there are three online customers served by the RSR. 12 miles farther down, the Rochester and Southern passes through P&L Junction, its connection point with the GNWR. The line then continues south to Silver Springs, where the RSR interchanges with the Southern Tier Line in the heart of Silver Springs.

Since the merger with G&W RR, the RSR operates their track from Caledonia south to Retsof, New York. There, the old G&W engine shops are still used for the GWI locomotive fleet. From Retsof, the RSR continues south via ex-DL&W/EL track to Mount Morris (village), New York, where there is a new American Salt mine. From there, the line continues south to Dansville, NY, where two new companies occupy the former Foster-Wheeler plant: Bombardier Transportation and American Motive Power. A portion of the line from Mt Morris to Dansville is via the Dansville and Mount Morris Railroad - specifically this is from a connection in Groveland, NY between the DL&W and the DMM south to Dansville.

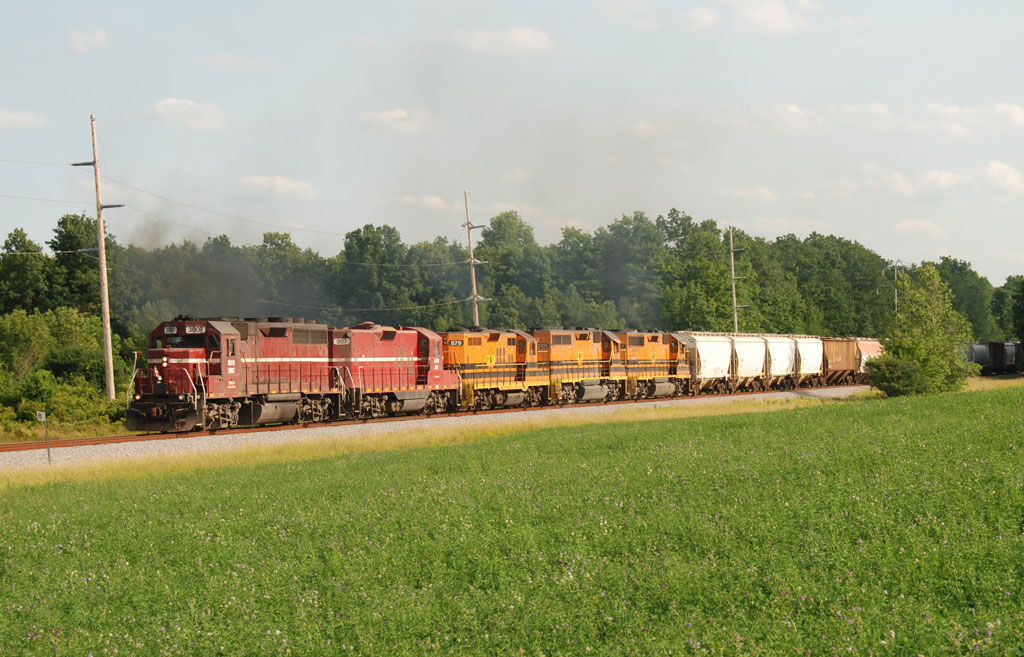
RSR salt train headed north, with a variety of GPs.

=== Notable mileposts ===
- 0.0 Lincoln Park Line end
- 1.9 Jct. with CSXT at CP-373
- 2.4 Belt Line Junction
- 3.5 Brooks Avenue Yard
- 6.1 Jct. with CSXT and LAL at Genesee Jct.
- 19.5 P&L Jct. - Caledonia
- 50.9 Silver Springs - Jct. with NS - End track

== History ==
The trackage owned today by the R&S, except for the GNWR subdivision, was constructed by the Rochester and State Line Railroad, which began operations on January 28, 1878, between Rochester and Salamanca (a town that is now on the RSR's sister railroad, the Buffalo and Pittsburgh Railroad). The name changed to the Rochester and Pittsburg Railroad in 1881 and was absorbed into the Buffalo, Rochester and Pittsburgh Railway in 1886. The line was purchased by the Baltimore and Ohio Railroad in 1932, which maintained ownership of the line as the Chessie System and CSX before the line between Rochester and Silver Springs was sold to GWI in 1985. Operations under the new railroad, the Rochester and Southern, began in 1986.

The RSR main line to Silver Springs formerly continued along the B&RP/B&O lines through southern Wyoming and northern Allegany counties through Machias Junction and beyond Ashford Junction. The line between Silver Springs and Machias was abandoned and later removed in the early 1990s after sister line B&P took over operation of the southern portion of the line.
