= Turtlepoint, Pennsylvania =

Unincorporated community in Pennsylvania, US

- Unincorporated community
- Location within Pennsylvania Location within the United States
- Coordinates: 41°52′18″N 78°20′23″W
- Country: United States
- State: Pennsylvania
- County: McKean
- Township: Annin
- Elevation: 1,463 ft (446 m)
- Time zone: UTC-5 (Eastern (EST))
  - Summer (DST): UTC-4 (EDT)
- ZIP code: 16750
- Area code: 814
- GNIS feature ID: 1189976

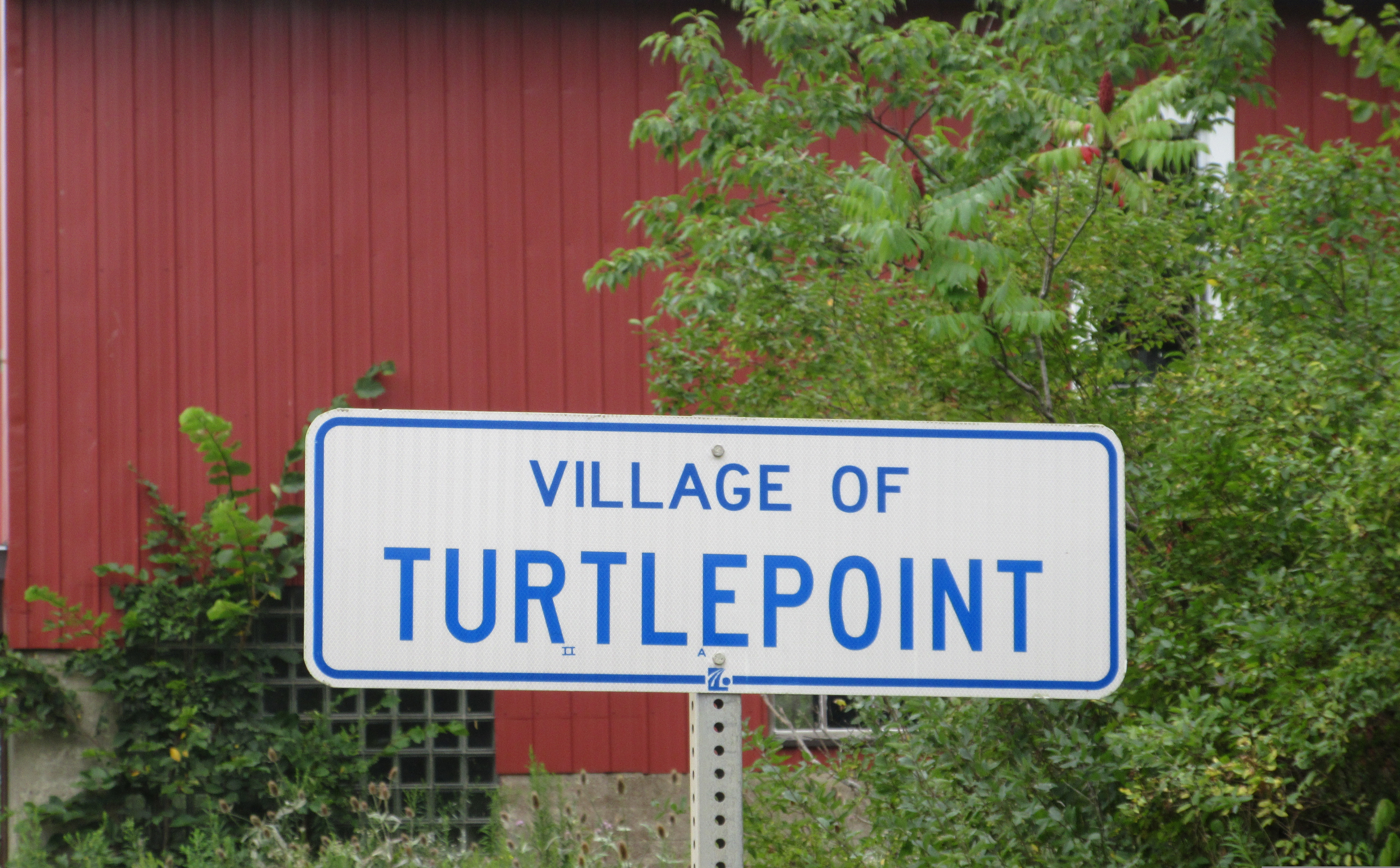
Road sign for Turtlepoint, PA

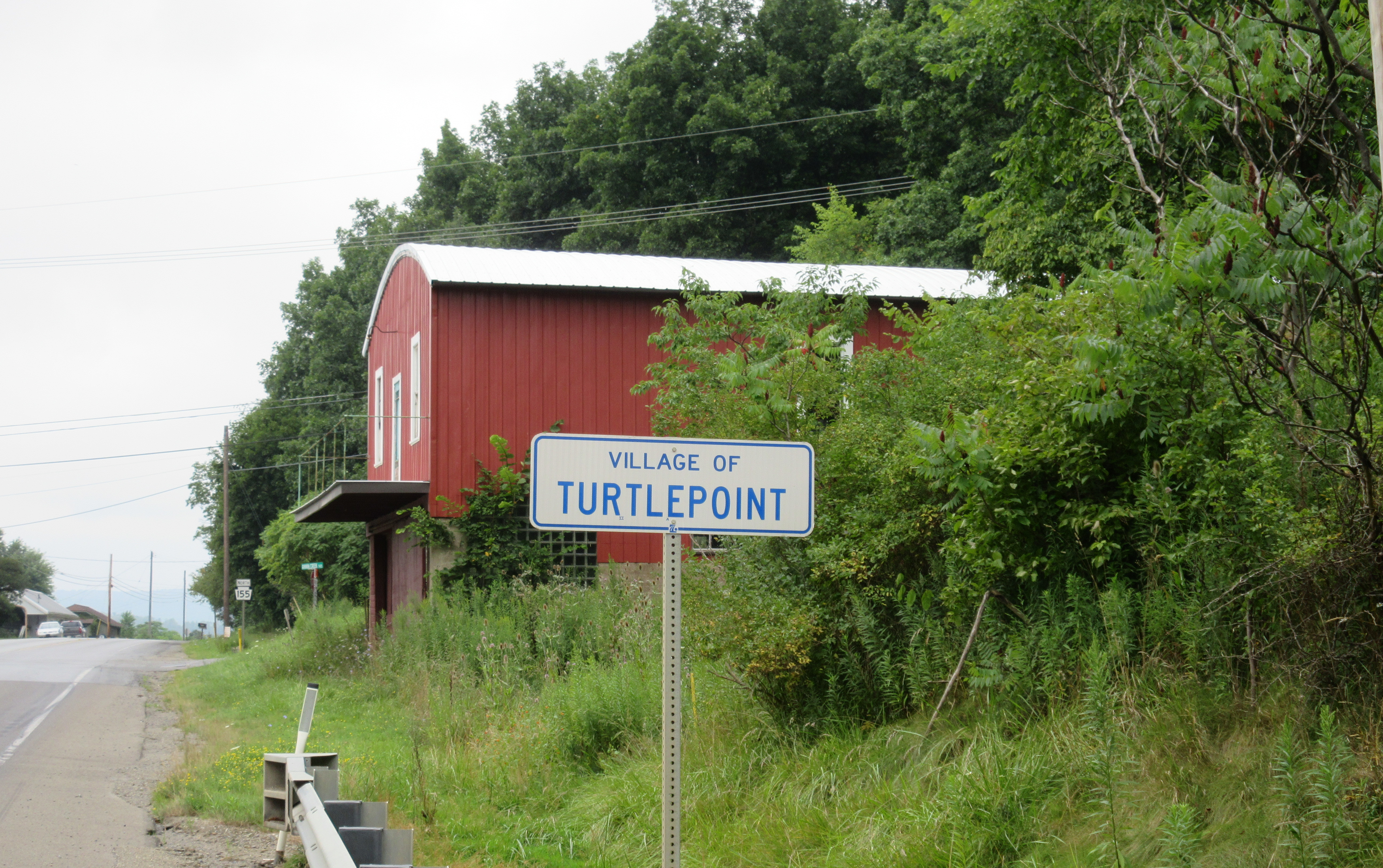
Road sign for Turtlepoint, PA on Route 155 with building in background

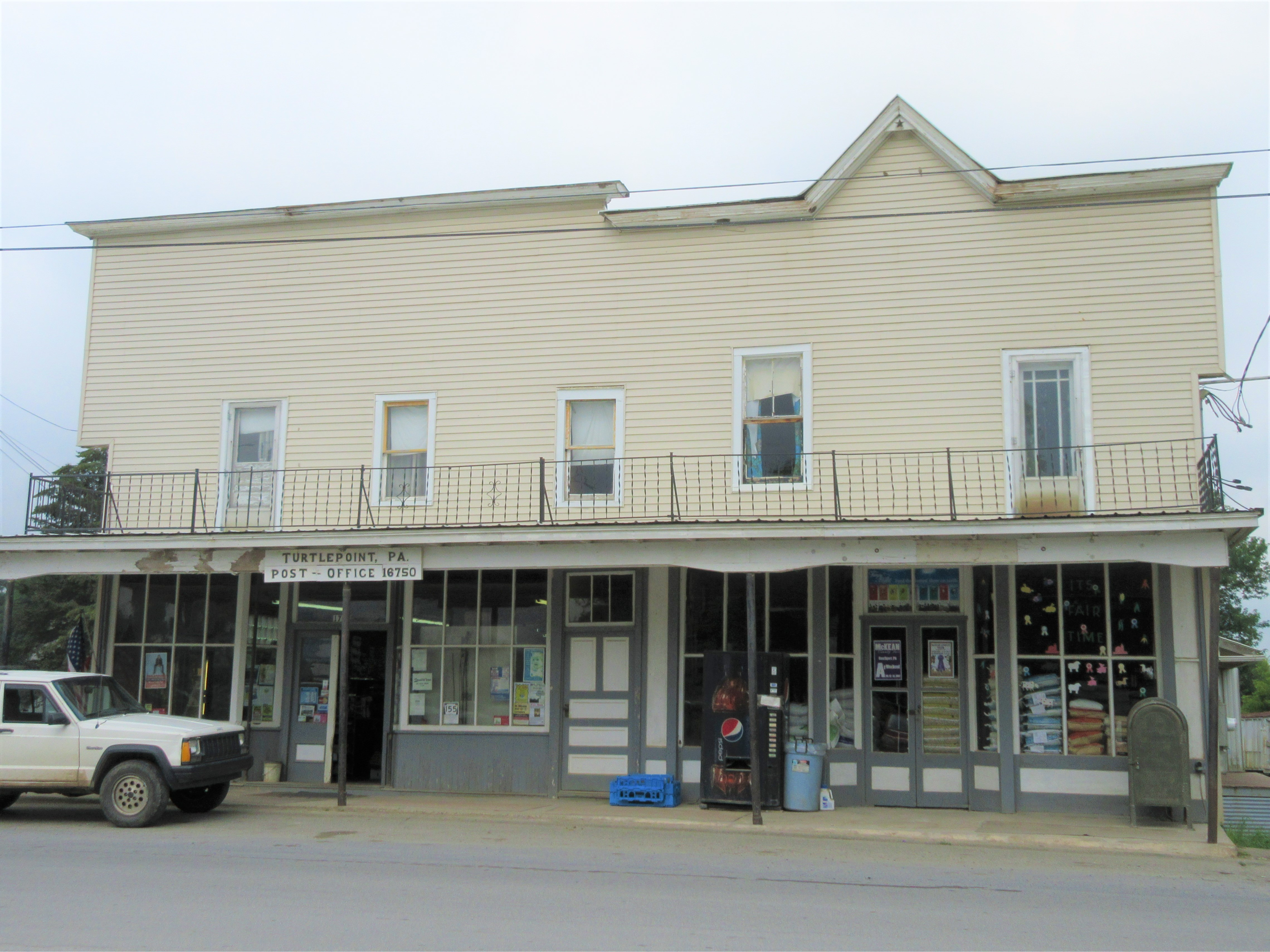
Carlsons' Store, Turtlepoint PA

Turtlepoint is an unincorporated community in Annin Township, McKean County, Pennsylvania, United States. The community is located along Pennsylvania Route 155, approximately 5.2 miles (8.4 km) northwest of Port Allegany. Turtlepoint has a post office with ZIP code 16750. The Allegheny River flows through the area.

The area is notable for its large, flat farm fields, a rarity in mountainous Northern Pennsylvania. The community is also home to a gravel pit business.

A center of the community is Carlsons' Store, which features a grocery store, meat market, deli, US Post Office, and agricultural supplies/feed store. It has been operated by the Carlson family for several generations and is a rare remaining example of the general stores that were common in rural parts of North America in the middle of the twentieth century.

== Filming of Unstoppable ==
Parts of the 2010 film Unstoppable were filmed in Turtlepoint and many of the small communities nearby. The scene involving the horse trailer being hit by the train was filmed at Carlsons' Store.

== Notable people ==
- Susan "Busty Heart" Sykes, big-bust entertainer, owns a strip club in the hamlet
- Martin Causer, American politician, resident of the hamlet for over 20 years
