= Irvine, Pennsylvania =

Unincorporated community in Pennsylvania, US

- Unincorporated community
- Location within Pennsylvania
- Coordinates: 41°50′21″N 79°16′06″W
- Country: United States
- State: Pennsylvania
- County: Warren
- Elevation: 1,158 ft (353 m)
- Time zone: UTC-5 (Eastern (EST))
  - Summer (DST): UTC-4 (EDT)
- ZIP code: 16329
- Area code: 814
- GNIS feature ID: 1177865

Irvine is an unincorporated community in Warren County, Pennsylvania, United States. The community is located near the junction of U.S. Route 6 and U.S. Route 62, 6.4 miles (10.3 km) west of Warren. Irvine has a post office with ZIP code 16329.
