= Starbrick, Pennsylvania =

Unincorporated community in Pennsylvania, US

Coordinates: 41°50′25″N 79°12′19″W

- Census-designated place
- Interactive map of Starbrick, Pennsylvania
- Country: United States
- State: Pennsylvania
- County: Warren

Population (2010)
  - Total: 522
- Time zone: UTC-5 (Eastern (EST))
  - Summer (DST): UTC-4 (EDT)
- ZIP code: 16365
- Area code: 814

Starbrick is a census-designated place located in Conewango Township, Warren County in the state of Pennsylvania, United States. The community is located along the famous U.S. Route 6, just to the west of the city of Warren. As of the 2010 census the population was 522 residents.

== Education ==
It is in the Warren County School District.
