= Buffalo and Pittsburgh Railroad =

Class II railroad operating in New York and Pennsylvania

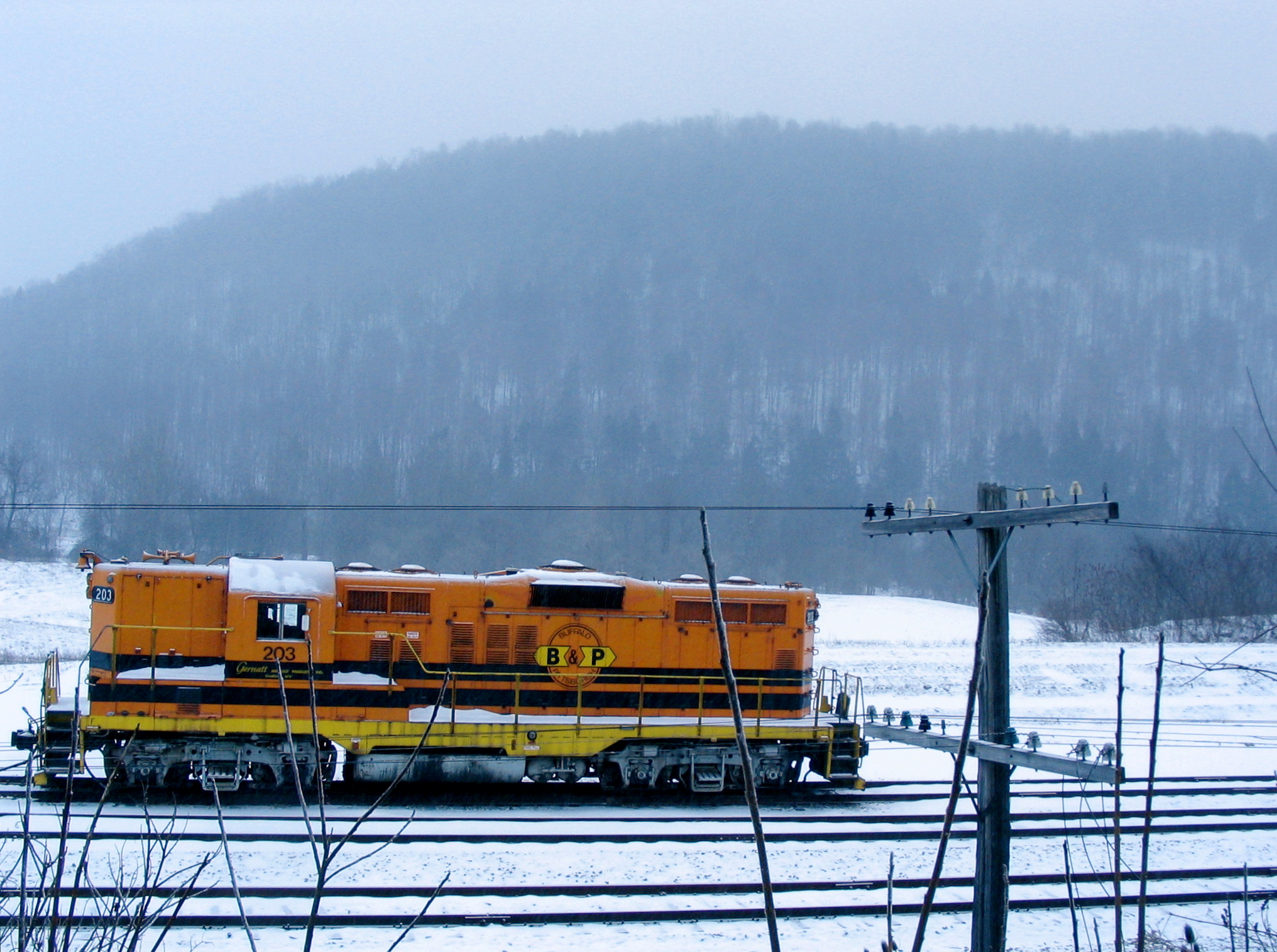
- A locomotive on the Buffalo and Pittsburgh Railroad in 2006

Overview
- Headquarters: Rochester, New York, U.S.
- Reporting mark: BPRR
- Locale: Northwestern Pennsylvania, U.S.
- Dates of operation: 1988–present

Technical
- Track gauge: 4 ft 8 1/2 in (1,435 mm) standard gauge
- Length: 659 miles (1,061 km)

Other
- Website: www.gwrr.com/bprr

The Buffalo and Pittsburgh Railroad (reporting mark BPRR) is a Class II railroad operating in New York and Pennsylvania.

The BPRR is owned by Genesee & Wyoming. Its main line runs between Buffalo, New York, and Eidenau, Pennsylvania, north of Pittsburgh. Here, connections are made to the city center via the Allegheny Valley Railroad. The system runs largely on former Baltimore & Ohio (B&O) lines. The entire BPRR system is 659 miles (1,061 km).

Major commodities carried include paper, petroleum products, chemicals, coal, steel, and sand.

== Main line ==
The Buffalo-Eidenau main line passes through Salamanca, NY, Bradford, PA, Johnsonburg, PA, DuBois, PA, Punxsutawney, PA, and Butler, PA.

Principal rail yards are located at Butler, Punxsutawney (Riker), and Buffalo, with support yards for local industry at other locations.

B&P initially used the direct former B&O/BR&P main between Buffalo and Salamanca, but during the 1990s a failing bridge at Springville, New York forced the railroad to detour its trains north of Ashford Junction via the former Rochester & Southern track to Machias Junction, New York, thence north on Conrail's/Norfolk Southern's ex-Pennsylvania Railroad Buffalo Line to Buffalo. Buffalo & Pittsburgh now is the sole user of the ex-PRR south of CP-GRAVITY in Buffalo.

BPRR operates two key secondary lines. One runs between Erie and Johnsonburg along the Philadelphia and Erie Railroad main line. Another is made up of former Pittsburg & Shawmut Railroad tracks, running from the Armstrong Power Plant in Reesedale, Pennsylvania to Freeport, Pennsylvania. The B&P also operates on the Low Grade between Brookville, Pennsylvania and Driftwood that was formerly used by the Pennsylvania Railroad, then Conrail and for a short time, the Pittsburg and Shawmut Railroad. For a short time the railroad also operated the former Low Grade between Brookville, PA and Lawsonham, PA, as well as the branch to Sligo, PA. However, this portion of the Low Grade was taken out of service in 2004, and the tracks were removed in 2007. A portion of the former B&O Northern Subdivision is used to provide access to Petrolia, PA.

There are many interchanges in BPRR. The Canadian National Railway has interchanges at Buffalo, New York and Butler, Pennsylvania. Canadian Pacific Kansas City has an interchange at Buffalo, New York. CSX Transportation has interchanges at Buffalo, New York, Erie, Pennsylvania. and New Castle, Pennsylvania. Norfolk Southern Railway has interchanges in Buffalo, Erie, Driftwood, Pennsylvania, Freeport, Pennsylvania, and Pittsburgh.

Rochester & Southern Railroad and Buffalo Southern Railroad also each have one interchange at Buffalo, New York. Western New York & Pennsylvania Railroad have one at East Salamanca, New York. Allegheny Valley Railroad also has one, located in Allison Park, Pennsylvania. Lastly, Wheeling and Lake Erie Railway has one in Bruceton, Pennsylvania.

CSX Transportation leases the P&W Subdivision to the B&P between Allison Park and the New Castle Yard in West Pittsburg, just outside New Castle, PA. Though the B&P ends in Allison Park, the railroad rarely traverses the line down to the borough. Instead, it transfers its goods to the AVR either in Evans City or Bakerstown depending on the amount of freight it has. Other owned and operated branch lines travel to Homer City, St Marys, and Brookville, Pennsylvania, as well as to the Buffalo suburb of Orchard Park, New York.

== History ==
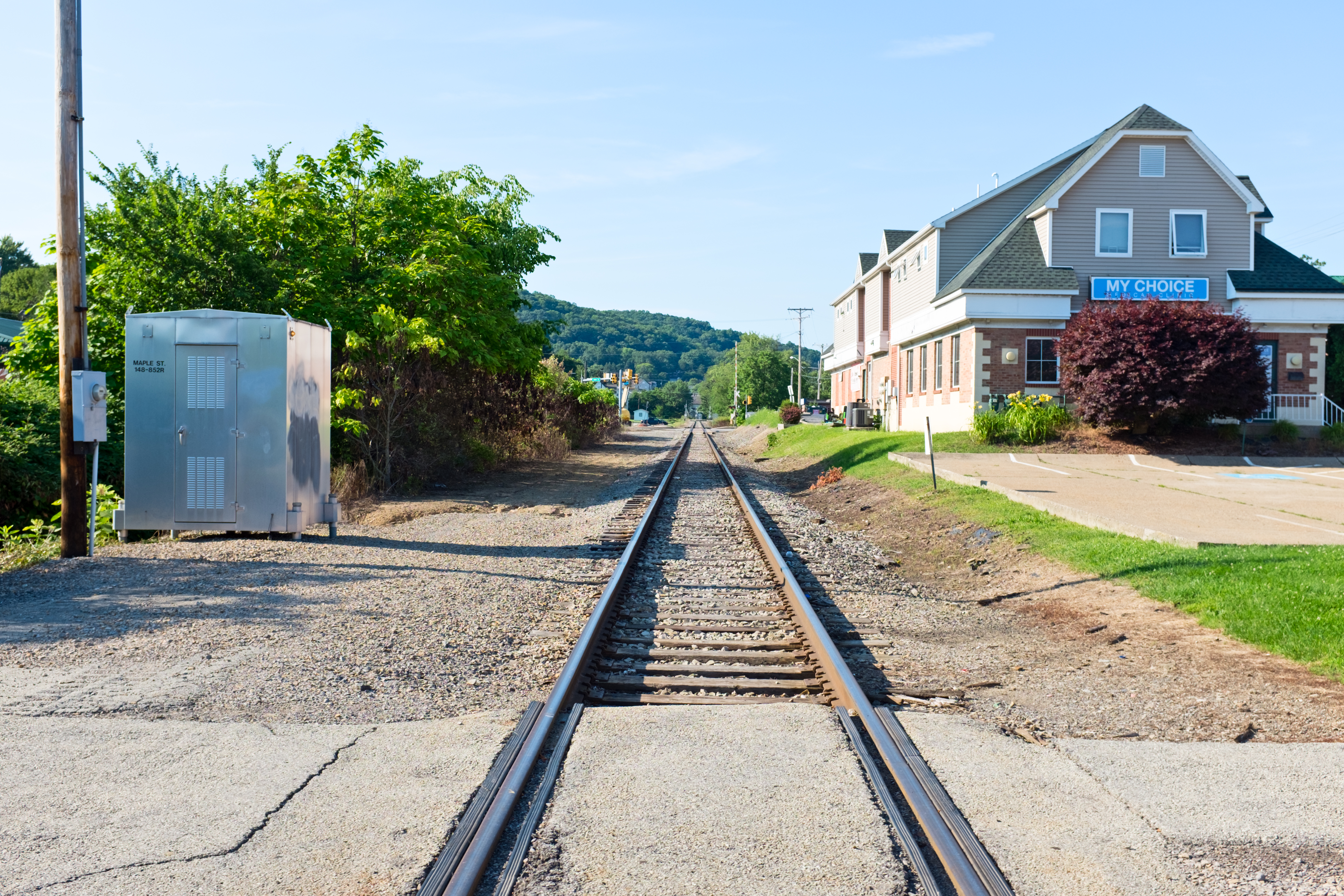
Indiana subdivision

Operations began in 1988 over mostly former Baltimore & Ohio Railroad (formerly Buffalo, Rochester and Pittsburgh Railway) lines. In the early 2000s, the BPRR merged other GWI railroads into it. These lines include the Allegheny & Eastern Railroad (ALY), Pittsburg & Shawmut Railroad (PSR), and the Bradford Industrial Railroad (BR).

Around 2005 the Indiana Subdivision, which had been out of use, was rehabilitated to serve the Homer City Generating Station. Shortly after this, the Ridge Subdivision, which had seen a Norfolk Southern coal train run-through to Shelocta was sold off to NS. In 2006, the railroad was honored as the Regional Railroad of the Year by Railway Age magazine.

== Fleet ==
The BPRR fleet, as of April 2024, consists of the following. Almost all locomotives were manufactured by EMD between the late 1950s and early 1970s.

Active Roster

Number	Type	Built	Notes
2000-2003	EMD GP38	1967-1971	
120, 121	SLUG	1964/1980	Rebuilds from GP35/GP50 respectively.
3020–3021, 3050, 3100–3103, 3106–3107, 3120-3121	EMD GP40-2	1966-1969	3120-3121 are the variant GP40-3, rebuilt by CSX in 2014 as SLUG mothers.
2004, 2030, 2142, 2143, 2167, 2172, 2176-2178, 2184, 3512, 3563, 3564, 3574, 3575, 3581-3583	EMD GP38-2	1979-1982	2100's are NS heritage, 3500's are UP heritage.
4528, 4813, 4823, 4827, 4830, 4851, 4868, 4885, 4889, 4923, 4933, 4941, 4973	GE C44-9W	1998-1999	All are ex-BNSF locomotives purchased from Wabtec.

Historic Roster

Number	Type	Built	Notes
21	EMD NW2	1942	Small switching locomotive.
33	EMD SW1200	1960	Small switching locomotive.
44	EMD MP15DC	1975	
51, 2000-2003	EMD GP38	1967-1971	
120, 121	SLUG	1964/1980	Rebuilds from GP35/GP50 respectively.
101-102, 104, 3020–3021, 3050, 3100–3103, 3106–3107, 3120-3121	EMD GP40-2	1966-1969	101-102, 104, 3100–3103, 3107, 3120-3121 are the variant GP40-3, rebuilt by CSX in 2014.
202-210, 626, 874, 879, 886-887	EMD GP9	1955-1959	887 was scrapped in 2024
305	EMD GP35	1964	
450-463, 3063-3064	EMD SD45	1966-1970	450-463 are the variant SD45R, rebuilt by Southern Pacific between 1979 and 1989. #463 was scrapped in September 2012. 3063-3064 is variant SD40-3.
922, 926	EMD GP18	1959	926 was scrapped in 2024
1002	EMD SW1001	1973	Small switching locomotive.
1400-1401	GS1400	2010	Custom-built by the Brookville Equipment Corporation.
1506-1515	EMD SW1500	1969-1972	Small switching locomotives.
2004, 2030, 2142, 2143, 2167, 2172, 2176-2178, 2184, 3512, 3563, 3564, 3574, 3575, 3581-3583, 9425	EMD GP38-2	1979-1982	2100's are NS heritage, 3500's are UP heritage.
2470	Santa Fe CF7	1953	Originally an EMD F7, almost completely rebuilt by AT&SF in 1974.
3000-3001, 3032, 3062, 3111, 6410, 6416	EMD GP40	1966-1968	
3301-3302	EMD SD40T-2	1967-1969	
3323, 3396	EMD SD40-2	1967-1971	3323 built for CNW, 3396 built for PRR.
3328, 3330–3332, 3342-3343, 3346	GMDD SD40	1969-1975	CN heritage built by GMDD in Canada.
3880-3885, 3886-3892	EMD SD60	1993-1994	3880-3885 are SD60I; 3886-3892 are SD60M, with full-width short hood.
4528, 4813, 4823, 4827, 4830, 4851, 4868, 4885, 4889, 4923, 4933, 4941, 4973	GE C44-9W	1998-1999	All are ex-BNSF locomotives purchased from Wabtec.
5018-5020	EMD SD50	1986	All are variant SD50-3, rebuilt by CSX in 2009.

Preceded by Red River Valley and Western Railroad	Regional Railroad of the Year; 2006	Succeeded by Florida East Coast Railway
