= William D. Mackowski =

American politician

Member of the Pennsylvania House of Representatives from the 67th district
- In office 1977–1986

Personal details
- Born: July 21, 1916 Bradford, Pennsylvania
- Died: November 22, 2002 (aged 86) Bradford, Pennsylvania
- Party: Republican

William D. Mackowski (July 21, 1916 – November 22, 2002) was a Republican member of the Pennsylvania House of Representatives.
