= National Register of Historic Places listings in Venango County, Pennsylvania =

Location of Venango County in Pennsylvania

This is a list of the National Register of Historic Places listings in Venango County, Pennsylvania.

This is intended to be a complete list of the properties and districts on the National Register of Historic Places in Venango County, Pennsylvania, United States. The locations of National Register properties and districts for which the latitude and longitude coordinates are included below, may be seen in a map.

There are 19 properties and districts listed on the National Register in the county, including 1 National Historic Landmark. Another property was once listed but has been removed.

This National Park Service list is complete through NPS recent listings posted January 23, 2026.

== Current listings ==
	Name on the Register	Image	Date listed	Location	City or town	Description
1	Allegheny Baptist Church	Allegheny Baptist Church	December 15, 1978 (#78002478)	Pennsylvania Route 27 and Main Street; 41°35′50″N 79°34′51″W	Pleasantville	
2	Bridge in Cherrytree Township	Bridge in Cherrytree Township	June 22, 1988 (#88000809)	State Route 1011 over Oil Creek, southeast of Titusville; 41°36′55″N 79°39′27″W	Cherrytree Township	
3	Bridge in Clinton Township	Bridge in Clinton Township	June 22, 1988 (#88000808)	State Route 3005 over Scrubgrass Creek, south of Kennerdell; 41°14′17″N 79°51′16″W	Clinton Township	Replaced in 2012
4	Connely-Holeman House	Connely-Holeman House	October 11, 2007 (#07001080)	317 Chestnut Street; 41°35′41″N 79°35′04″W	Pleasantville	
5	Samuel F. Dale House	Samuel F. Dale House	December 4, 1975 (#75001670)	1409 Elk Street; 41°23′55″N 79°50′04″W	Franklin	
6	Drake Oil Well	Drake Oil Well	November 13, 1966 (#66000695)	3 miles (5 km) southeast of Titusville on Pennsylvania Route 36, in Drake Well Memorial Park; 41°36′38″N 79°39′28″W	Cherrytree Township	
7	Emlenton Historic District	Emlenton Historic District	November 10, 1997 (#97001256)	Roughly bounded by the Allegheny River, the borough limits, Kerr Avenue, and Hickory and Center Streets; 41°10′47″N 79°42′43″W	Emlenton	
8	Franklin Historic District	Franklin Historic District	January 26, 1984 (#84003583)	Roughly bounded by Miller Avenue and Otter, 8th, Buffalo, and 16th Streets; 41°23′36″N 79°49′52″W	Franklin	
9	Indian God Rock Petroglyphs Site (36VE26)	Indian God Rock Petroglyphs Site (36VE26)	May 14, 1984 (#84003585)	On the eastern bank of the Allegheny River above Brandon; 41°19′48″N 79°49′27″W	Rockland Township	
10	National Transit Building	National Transit Building	September 13, 1978 (#78002477)	206 Seneca Street; 41°26′03″N 79°42′32″W	Oil City	
11	Oil City Armory	Oil City Armory	May 9, 1991 (#91000517)	Junction of East 2nd and State Streets; 41°25′38″N 79°42′33″W	Oil City	
12	Oil City Downtown Commercial Historic District	Oil City Downtown Commercial Historic District	October 24, 1997 (#97001250)	Generally along Seneca, Center, Elm, Sycamore, Duncomb, and Main Streets; 41°26′08″N 79°42′31″W	Oil City	
13	Oil City North Side Historic District	Oil City North Side Historic District	November 12, 1999 (#99001335)	Roughly bounded by the Conrail railroad line, Manning Street, Park Road, Deer Street, and Linden, Hasson, Bishop, Carroll, and East Bissell Avenues; 41°26′06″N 79°42′45″W	Oil City	
14	Oil City South Side Historic District	Oil City South Side Historic District	November 10, 1997 (#97001249)	Roughly bounded by the Allegheny River, Wilson Avenue, Lee's Lane, West Third, West Fifth, and Reservoir Streets; 41°25′18″N 79°43′12″W	Oil City	
15	Pithole Stone Arch	Pithole Stone Arch	June 22, 1988 (#88000869)	State Route 1004 over Pithole Creek; 41°29′13″N 79°35′43″W	Cornplanter and President Townships	
16	Rockland Furnace	Rockland Furnace	September 6, 1991 (#91001139)	On Shull Run north of the Allegheny River, northwest of Emlenton; 41°14′03″N 79°44′57″W	Rockland Township	
17	Site of Pithole City	Site of Pithole City	March 20, 1973 (#73001667)	10 miles (16 km) southeast of Titusville; 41°31′16″N 79°35′14″W	Cornplanter Township	
18	U.S. Post Office	U.S. Post Office	September 15, 1977 (#77001197)	270 Seneca Street; 41°26′09″N 79°42′33″W	Oil City	
19	Witherup Bridge	Witherup Bridge	June 22, 1988 (#88000800)	State Route 3007 over Scrubgrass Creek, south of Kennerdell; 41°15′18″N 79°50′27″W	Clinton Township	

== Former listing ==
	Name on the Register	Image	Date listed	Date removed	Location	City or town	Description
1	Plumer Block		April 20, 1978 (#78002476)	June 27, 1988	1205 Liberty Street	Franklin	

== See also ==
- List of Pennsylvania state historical markers in Venango County
