= Pithole Valley Railway =

Railroad in Venango County, Pennsylvania, USA

The Pithole Valley Railway was an ephemeral short line railroad in Venango County, Pennsylvania, constructed as a result of the Pennsylvania oil rush. The railroad was originally constructed in 1865 between Oil City, Pennsylvania, a local oil transportation hub, and the boomtown of Pithole, Pennsylvania. Constructed under the charter of the Clarion Land and Improvement Company, it was informally known as the Oil City and Pithole Branch Railroad. Although it was generally supported by the broad gauge Atlantic and Great Western Railway, it was built to standard gauge. Conflict with the Warren and Franklin Railway over the right-of-way along the Allegheny River led to a lawsuit which, in 1866, declared that the Oil City and Pithole had no right to operate along the river from Oleopolis, Pennsylvania to Oil City. That part of the line was sold to the Warren and Franklin, leaving the Oil City and Pithole with a 7-mile (10 km) line running north from Oleopolis to Pithole along Pithole Creek.

The loss of the line into Oil City, and economic issues in the Pennsylvania oil fields more generally, rendered the railroad unprofitable: it was sequestered in December 1866, and thereafter run by George V. Forman on behalf of its creditors. Forman worked with Jacob Vandergrift, a major investor in the railroad, to increase the number of oil shipments originating on the railroad by the construction of a pipeline to Pithole and the operation of a tank car line. By 1870, the boom in the immediate vicinity of Pithole was over, and the railroad was sold under foreclosure that year. It was reorganized in the following year as the Pithole Valley Railway. The directors of the reorganized railroad included S. L. M. Barlow, a lawyer closely associated with the Atlantic and Great Western. The new management was also closely connected with the Pennsylvania Petroleum Railroad, chartered in 1872, which would have tapped the oil fields from the north for the benefit of the Atlantic and Great Western. The managers planned to extend the Pithole Valley north through Pleasantville, Pennsylvania, another oil-producing town, to connect with the Pennsylvania Petroleum Railroad's main line. The Atlantic and Great Western sold a large bond issue to cover the construction and extension of these railroads, which was to be paid back from their revenues when completed. However, the money from the bonds was diverted to cover interest on the Atlantic and Great Western's existing mortgage bonds, so no extension of the Pithole Valley ever took place. Still unprofitable to operate, the rails and equipment were removed by 1876 and sold to the Shenango and Allegheny Railroad, another Atlantic and Great Western affiliate. The Pithole Valley remained in existence as a paper corporation through at least 1885, but was never rebuilt or operated again.

== Background ==
The drilling of the Drake Well in 1859 demonstrated that petroleum could be extracted in commercially viable quantities from oil deposits in northwestern Pennsylvania, and stimulated a regional boom in oil extraction. The Pennsylvania oilfields were located in a remote region of the state, lacking an extensive transportation network; in the initial stages of the boom, the crude oil was generally shipped by water down the Allegheny River to be refined in Pittsburgh, Pennsylvania. The unreliability of water transport (due to ice and low water levels in season) encouraged the construction of railroads into the oilfield. Three trunk lines, the Erie, the New York Central (NYC), and the Pennsylvania (PRR), were close enough to extend, via subsidiaries, into the oil region; together, they allowed oil producers to ship crude oil not only to Pittsburgh, but to the New York City area, where extensive refining capacity already existed from processing cannel coal in the 1850s. A rail link to the oil region made it possible for John D. Rockefeller and his partners to found the first oil refinery in Cleveland, Ohio in 1863, and the refining industry there soon came to rival that of New York or Pittsburgh.

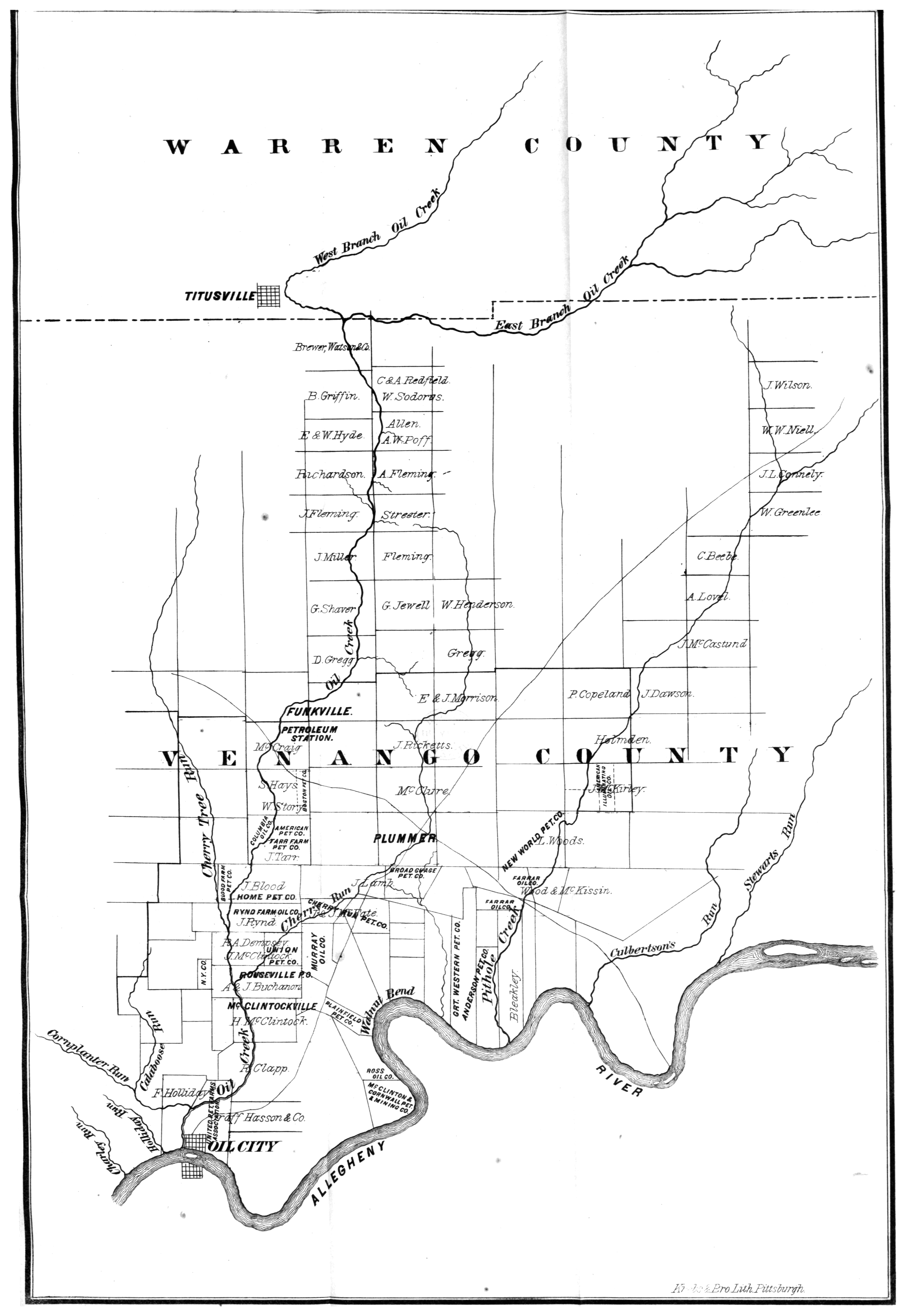
Map of the Venango County oil region, showing waterways, Oil City, and Titusville.

The first railroad to reach the oil fields was the Oil Creek Railroad, which built from Corry, Pennsylvania south along Oil Creek, reaching Titusville in 1862 and Petroleum Center in 1863. Construction stopped here, although the railroad had charter rights to build south to the mouth of Oil Creek at Oil City, and then downstream along the Allegheny River to Franklin, Pennsylvania. The Oil Creek Railroad was initially built to a broad gauge compatible with the Erie system; a connection at Corry with the Atlantic and Great Western Railroad, another broad gauge railroad, allowed oil from the region to move north over the Erie to New York, and from November 1863, to Cleveland as well. In 1863, it made its line dual gauge, allowing it to interchange cars with the Philadelphia and Erie Railroad, a PRR subsidiary, which also connected with it at Corry; however, the Philadelphia and Erie ran east from Corry only as far as Warren, on the Allegheny River, and would not be completed to a link with the rest of the PRR at Williamsport until November 1864. Until then, oil traffic on the Philadelphia and Erie could only move to the NYC at Erie and then to New York or Cleveland.

The Oil Creek Railroad was independent, and coveted by all three trunk lines. (The PRR and NYC would join forces to detach it from the Erie system in July 1864.) Accordingly, each of the three sought to construct their own line into the oil field, to mitigate the consequences of losing the Oil Creek Railroad to a rival. The PRR chose as its vehicle the Warren and Tidioute Railroad, which had charter rights to build from the Philadelphia and Erie in Warren County southwest to Franklin. Such a railroad would naturally follow the Allegheny River southwest through Oil City on the way to Franklin. Surveys from Irvine on the Philadelphia & Erie to Oil City were made in the fall of 1863. Most of the land for the right-of-way was acquired in the following winter and spring, when its name was changed to the Warren and Franklin Railway, but due to labor and material shortages imposed by the American Civil War, construction did not begin until September 1865.

== Construction to Pithole ==
As the oil boom continued, the Clarion Land and Improvement Company was chartered on August 10, 1864. The charter of this company granted it the right to extract oil or minerals or otherwise improve up to 5000 acres of land in the northwestern Pennsylvania counties of Clarion, Elk, Forest, Jefferson, Venango, Mercer, and Lawrence, and to build railroads to connect its lands with any road or navigable stream, provided that the railroad did not exceed 20 miles in length and was not broad gauge.

The company was organized in December 1864. On January 7, 1865, an oil strike at the Frazier Well triggered a new oil boom along the valley of Pithole Creek, which entered the Allegheny River a few miles upstream of Oil City at Oleopolis, and led to the founding of the boomtown of Pithole, Pennsylvania. This new field, east of the existing fields in the Oil Creek valley, lacked good transportation outlets. The Clarion Land and Improvement Company obtained some scattered oil leases in the area, but its energies were focused on the construction of a railroad, as authorized by their charter, to serve the many new wells in the Pithole valley. A route was surveyed from Pithole south along Pithole Creek to Oleopolis and from there along the Allegheny to Oil City in July. It was informally named the Oil City and Pithole Branch Railroad.

Construction began in August 1865. It may have been backed by the Atlantic and Great Western, which was building a new line into Oil City from the west, via Franklin. The gorge of the Allegheny offered little room for a railroad: if the Oil City and Pithole Branch Railroad occupied it first, there would be no room for the Warren and Franklin Railway to build a parallel line from Oil City to Oleopolis. Construction on the latter commenced in October, and the two railroads employed large construction forces, building towards each other at speed. The engineer of the Oil City and Pithole threatened to hold off the Warren and Franklin crew by force. In Oil City, the Warren and Franklin crew attempted to cover or tear up the roadbed being built by the Oil City and Pithole. Jacob Shirk, one of the Oil City and Pithole directors, drew a revolver and was mobbed by the opposing crew; he fled into town, where White, the leader of the Warren and Franklin work crew, was ultimately arrested and jailed. Ultimately, the Oil City and Pithole proceeded with its work and completed its line of rail into Oil City. By January 1, 1866, the line from Pithole to Oleopolis had opened. On February 7, the south end had been opened from Oil City to the Sumner and Pratt purchase, and through traffic from Oil City to Pithole commenced in early March 1866.

== Collapse of the boom ==
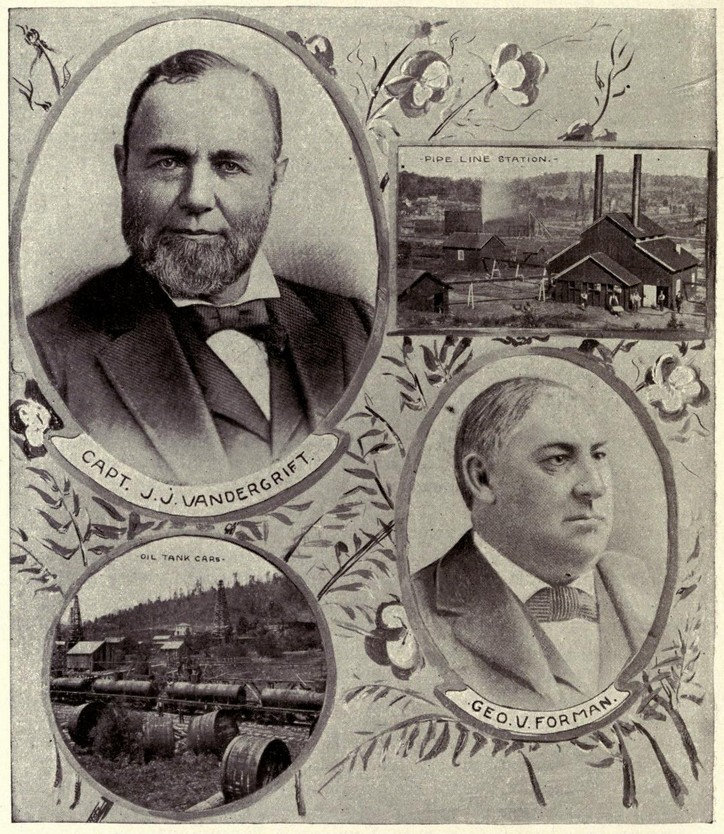
Forman & Vandergrift and their improvements for transporting oil.

The success of the construction crews was immediately followed by a series of disasters. On March 27, 1866, Charles Vernon Culver's banking companies failed, triggering an economic collapse in the oil region and a fall in oil prices. A major fire swept Oil City on May 26, 1866, and the Oil City and Pithole used freight cars to help residents evacuate their goods ahead of the fire. The Oil City and Pithole also faced a lawsuit filed in February by the Warren and Franklin, seeking to eject the Oil City and Pithole from its right-of-way along the river. The case reached the Supreme Court of Pennsylvania, which handed down a judgment on May 24, 1866: the Clarion Land and Improvement Company's charter gave it the right to build a railroad only as far as Oleopolis, where it reached navigable water and a connection with the Warren and Franklin. It was enjoined from interfering with the Warren and Franklin's efforts to construct and operate a railroad. The Warren and Franklin purchased the disputed line from Oil City to Oleopolis and opened its line from Irvine to Oil City on August 1, leaving the Oil City and Pithole with the 7-mile line from Pithole to Oleopolis.

Oil originating at Pithole could move via the Oil City and Pithole and the Warren and Franklin to Oil City. It was not limited to further movement on the Warren and Franklin; the broad-gauge Atlantic and Great Western laid a standard-gauge rail on its track through Oil City, so oil tankers from the standard-gauge railroads could be moved to oil yards on the west side of Oil Creek and their contents transferred to broad-gauge cars.

On December 10, 1866, George V. Forman was appointed sequestrator for the Oil City and Pithole. He continued to direct the operations of the railroad on behalf of creditors for several years. In the meantime, the oil wells around Pithole were rapidly fading out, and the area was becoming depopulated. Some work was done on an extension north 5 miles from Pithole to Pleasantville, where another local boom took place in 1868, but it is not clear that this was ever completed or opened. Forman joined Jacob J. Vandergrift, who had invested heavily in the Oil City and Pithole, to establish the Star Tank Line, which furnished tank cars for shipping oil from Pithole and was absorbed by Standard Oil in 1873. The two also constructed a 4-mile pipeline from West Pithole to Pithole to bring more oil traffic to the railroad. The Oil City and Pithole was sold under foreclosure on October 28, 1870.

== Reorganization and abandonment ==
On May 13, 1871, the Pithole Valley Railway was organized to operate the Oil City and Pithole, now detached from the Clarion Land and Improvement Company. The Pithole Valley Railway Extension had been incorporated on February 27, 1871 to extend the line north from Pithole to Titusville, but never laid any track. Most of the officers and directors were Pennsylvanians: A. H. Steele, the president, and John A. Dale, the treasurer were both from Tionesta. However, directors S. L. M. Barlow and Charles Day were from New York. They represented the interests of the Atlantic and Great Western; Barlow was one of the American agents of James McHenry, the English financier who controlled that railroad.

The Pithole Valley inherited two engines from its predecessor: a Baldwin 4-4-0 bought new in 1865, #1, and a 2-6-0T bought in 1869, #2. It bought another 4-4-0 new from Baldwin in 1871, which replaced the old #2, which was sold. Trains stopped regularly at Oleopolis, Bennett, Woods, Prathers Mill, and Pithole.

The Pennsylvania Petroleum Railroad was chartered in 1872, and its leadership largely overlapped with that of the Pithole Valley: Steele was president and Dale, Barlow and Day were directors. The new railroad proposed to build from Tidioute, on the Allegheny River upstream of Oleopolis, west through Titusville and northwest to the harbor at Erie to provide another outlet for the region's oil. The Pithole Valley was to be extended a short distance north of Pleasantville to reach the Pennsylvania Petroleum's main line at a point designated Colorado Junction. The project obtained the backing of the Atlantic and Great Western, which, in February 1873, leased those railroads, as well as the Shenango and Allegheny Railroad, and issued bonds secured by those lease payments to complete construction. In April, John H. Devereaux was hired by James McHenry to become general manager of the Atlantic and Great Western; he was an experienced railroad executive, and McHenry badly needed the involvement of a respectable figure to lend legitimacy to his projects. In September, Devereaux was informed by the company treasurer that the revenue from the leased line bonds had been diverted in March to pay interest on the second mortgage bonds of the Atlantic and Great Western. This lack of funds meant that construction was not completed on the Pennsylvania Petroleum and the Pithole Valley railroads. The Atlantic and Great Western's involvement with these leased lines meant that most of the Pithole Valley's officers and directors were replaced by those of the Atlantic and Great Western; Devereaux assumed the presidency, while Steele became vice-president.

The misappropriation of the bond revenue testified to the particularly bad financial state of the Atlantic and Great Western, but speculative over-extension generally prevailed among American railroads of the time. That fall, the Panic of 1873 took place as the speculative bubble collapsed, making it much more difficult to finance railroad construction than in the preceding years. The Pithole Valley had been operating at a loss for several years, and around late 1874 or February 1, 1875, the Atlantic and Great Western ceased to operate the line. It was sold at foreclosure on February 24 to satisfy a debt for railroad ties and bought by Henry S. Huidekoper, then the president of the company, for about $600, the money being furnished by Devereaux as receiver of the Atlantic and Great Western. The rolling stock (the two engines and about twelve freight cars) was removed and leased to the Shenango and Allegheny. Rails were removed from part of the line, although the corporation remained in existence, hoping for a resumption of the Pennsylvania Petroleum Railroad project. The remaining track was removed by 1876; the rails and the two Baldwin locomotives were sold to the Shenango and Allegheny in 1878. Bereft of track and equipment, the Pithole Valley Railway apparently continued to exist as a paper corporation. Steele re-assumed the presidency in March 1880, together with that of the Pennsylvania Petroleum Railroad. He held these offices as late as 1885. However, the Pennsylvania Petroleum Railroad was never completed, nor was the Pithole Valley Railway ever put into operation again.

== Bibliography ==
- Boyle, Patrick C., ed. (1898). The Derrick's Hand-Book of Petroleum. Vol. I. Oil City, Pennsylvania: Derrick Publishing Co.
- Churella, Albert J. (2013). The Pennsylvania Railroad. Vol. I. Philadelphia, Pennsylvania: University of Pennsylvania Press. ISBN 978-0-8122-4348-2.
- Coverdale & Colpitts (1946). The Pennsylvania Railroad Company: The Corporate, Financial and Construction History of Lines Owned, Operated and Controlled To December 31, 1945. Volume II: Lines East of Pittsburgh. Philadelphia: Allen, Lane & Scott. OCLC 13172415.
- Smith, P. Frazer (1868). Pennsylvania State Reports. Vol. LIV. Philadelphia, Pennsylvania: Kay and Brother.
- Taber, Thomas T. III (1987). Railroads of Pennsylvania Encyclopedia and Atlas. Thomas T. Taber III. ISBN 0-9603398-5-X.
