= Stewart Run =

Stewart Run may refer to:

- Stewart Run (Octoraro Creek), a stream in Pennsylvania
- Stewart Run (Indian Creek), a stream in West Virginia
