= List of Pennsylvania state historical markers in Venango County =

Location of Venango County in Pennsylvania

This is a list of the Pennsylvania state historical markers in Venango County.

This is intended to be a complete list of the official state historical markers placed in Venango County, Pennsylvania by the Pennsylvania Historical and Museum Commission (PHMC). The locations of the historical markers, as well as the latitude and longitude coordinates as provided by the PHMC's database, are included below when available. There are 30 historical markers located in Venango County.

== Historical markers ==
Marker title	Image	Date dedicated	Location	Marker type	Topics
Charles Lockhart (1818-1905)		October 26, 2007	222 Center Street (PA 8), Oil City; 41.4344°N 79.7072°W	City	Business & Industry, Oil & Gas
Crawford Family, The		November 12, 2014	Emlenton Presbyterian Church, 508 Main Street, Emlenton; 41.17728°N 79.708057°W	Roadside	Professions & Vocations, Business & Industry, Oil & Gas
Densmore Tank Cars		October 15, 2004	William Flinn Highway (PA 8), south of Titusville; 41.56935°N 79.69202°W	Roadside	Entrepreneurs, Invention, Oil & Gas, Railroads, Transportation
Drake Well Park		n/a	At Drake Well Museum, southeast of Titusville; 41.61168°N 79.65747°W	Roadside	Business & Industry, Oil & Gas
Drake Well Park		March 20, 1947	At Drake Well Museum, SE of Titusville	Roadside	Business & Industry, Oil & Gas
First Oil Pipeline		November 15, 1954	Rouseville Road (PA 227), 4 miles southwest of Pleasantville; 41.54152°N 79.61088°W	Roadside	Business & Industry, Oil & Gas, Transportation
Fort Franklin		March 20, 1947	13th Street (US 322) & Franklin Avenue, Franklin; 41.40067°N 79.83112°W	Roadside	American Revolution, Forts, Military
Fort Machault		April 8, 1969	Elk Street & 8th Street (US 322), Franklin; 41.38942°N 79.82225°W	City	Forts, French & Indian War, Military
Fort Venango		October 10, 1972	Elk Street and 8th Street (US 322), Franklin; 41.38932°N 79.82217°W	City	Forts, French & Indian War, Military, Native American
Galena-Signal Oil Company		August 7, 1999	Near County Courthouse, 1140 Liberty Street, Franklin; 41.39635°N 79.82718°W	Roadside	Business & Industry, Oil & Gas, Railroads
George Bissell		October 18, 2002	Near County Courthouse in South Park, corner of Liberty & South Park Streets Franklin; 41.3967°N 79.82705°W	Roadside	Business & Industry, Oil & Gas, Professions & Vocations
Henry R. Rouse		December 11, 1996	PA 8 near south borough line of Rouseville; 41.46858°N 79.69145°W	Roadside	Business & Industry, Oil & Gas, Professions & Vocations
Humboldt Refinery		August 3, 2001	Masonic Hall, Plumer Village along PA 227 outside Oil City; 41.48545°N 79.65248°W	Roadside	Business & Industry, Invention, Oil & Gas
Jacob J. Vandergrift		August 3, 2001	Justus Park, Oil City; 41.432167°N 79.709000°W	Roadside	Business & Industry, Oil & Gas, Transportation
Jesse L. Reno (1823-1862)		June 20, 2014	US 62/PA 8 between 3rd & 4th Streets, Reno; 41.409817°N 79.752467°W	Roadside	Civil War, Military, Professions & Vocations
John Dewey		July 20, 1980	At Oil City Fire Department Headquarters, Central Avenue & West 4th Street, Oil City; 41.424950°N 79.710267°W	City	Education
John Franklin Carll (1826-1904)		October 23, 2007	205 East State Street (PA 36), Pleasantville; 41.590633°N 79.577350°W	Roadside	Business & Industry, Medicine & Science, Oil & Gas, Professions & Vocations
Johnny Appleseed		September 26, 1982	13th Street (US 322) & Franklin Avenue, Franklin; 41.400800°N 79.831050°W	City	Agriculture, Folklore, Professions & Vocations
Joseph Reid Gas Engine Company		October 10, 1997	Intersection of Main Street (PA 8), Halyday Street & Petroleum Street, Oil City; 41.432617°N 79.713033°W	City	Business & Industry, Oil & Gas
Oil Well Supply Company		October 10, 1997	East Front Street (US 62) & East First Street, Oil City; 41.4291°N 79.70908°W	City	Business & Industry, Oil & Gas
Old Garrison		March 20, 1947	10th & Liberty Streets (US 322), Franklin; 41.393100°N 79.825217°W	Roadside	Military, Military Post-Civil War
Oldest Oil Producing Well		August 5, 1958	William Flinn Highway (PA 8) at McClintock, just S of Rouseville; 41.45902°N 79.69002°W	Roadside	Business & Industry, Oil & Gas
Pithole		December 1, 1973	Pithole Road (SR 1006) at site 41.52487°N 79.5819°W	Roadside	Environment
Pithole		July 1, 1986	Rouseville Road (PA 227) & Pithole Road, ~5 miles from both Pleasantville and Rouseville; 41.51713°N 79.61913°W	Roadside	Business & Industry, Oil & Gas
Pithole City		July 26, 1966	At site on Pithole Road; 41.52442°N 79.58177°W	Roadside	Business & Industry, Oil & Gas
Samuel C. T. Dodd (1837-1907)		November 7, 2008	1247 Liberty Street near Pennsylvania Alley, Franklin; 41.397617°N 79.829850°W	City	Government & Politics 20th Century, Oil & Gas, Professions & Vocations, Writers
Speechley Gas Pool Well		October 28, 1999	Fryburg Road (PA 157) & Sawtown Road, east of US 62 junction & southeast of Oil City; 41.390517°N 79.583333°W	Roadside	Business & Industry, Oil & Gas
Venango County		October 18, 1981	County Courthouse, 12th & Liberty Streets, Franklin; 41.39742°N 79.82758°W	City	Government & Politics, Government & Politics 19th Century
Venango Path		August 23, 1987	Old Route 8 (SR 3013) & Georgetown Road (SR 3003), just north of Wesley; 41.23233°N 79.95628°W	Roadside	George Washington, Native American, Paths & Trails, Transportation

== See also ==
- List of Pennsylvania state historical markers
- National Register of Historic Places listings in Venango County, Pennsylvania
