= Jersey Bridge =

Jersey Bridge can refer to:

In the United States

- Jersey Bridge (Downieville, California), listed on the National Register of Historic Places (NRHP) in Sierra County
- Jersey Bridge (Cherrytree Township, Pennsylvania), listed on the NRHP in Venango County (as "Bridge in Cherrytree Township")
