= Pennsylvania Petroleum Railroad =

Railroad in Pennsylvania

The Pennsylvania Petroleum Railroad was a railroad in Pennsylvania originally chartered in 1871, during the Pennsylvania oil rush. Intended to provide an additional outlet from the Pennsylvania oil fields to Erie, Pennsylvania, it graded about ten miles of line in 1872, but was then caught up in the collapse of the Atlantic and Great Western Railroad, which halted the project. The company was foreclosed and reorganized under new names many times, but accomplished relatively little. It laid a short segment of line in 1890 in Titusville, Pennsylvania which was leased to a subsidiary of the New York Central to be used as a siding to a tannery. Further construction took place in 1913 with the idea of opening it as an electric railway to Cambridge Springs, but this, too, was never completed.

== Oil boom ==
The Pennsylvania Petroleum Railroad was chartered on September 13, 1871, to build a line of 67 miles (108 km) from Erie, Pennsylvania east to Tidioute, Pennsylvania. Adelbert H. Steele was elected president of the company; James T. Blair was secretary and Charles Day, treasurer. Steele was also president of the Pithole Valley Railway, while John A. Dale, S. L. M. Barlow and Day were directors of both companies. Tidioute is on the Allegheny River upstream of Oleopolis: the proposed railroad would have run west through Titusville and northwest to the harbor at Erie to provide another outlet for Pennsylvania oil. The Pithole Valley was to be extended a short distance north of Pleasantville to reach the Pennsylvania Petroleum's main line at a point designated Colorado Junction. About ten miles of grading were done on the route around 1872, probably between Titusville and Cambridge Springs, but no track was laid. Some grading was also reportedly done in Erie, along Liberty Street from 26th Street to 8th Street; from there, the main line would have descended along Little Cascade Creek to projected docks on Erie Harbor.

The project obtained the backing of the Atlantic and Great Western Railroad, which, in February 1873, proposed to lease those railroads, as well as the Shenango and Allegheny Railroad, and issued bonds secured by those lease payments to complete construction. However, revenue from the leased line bonds was instead diverted to pay interest on the second mortgage bonds of the Atlantic and Great Western. This lack of funds meant that construction was not completed on the Pennsylvania Petroleum and the Pithole Valley railroads. Sir John Swinburne, one of the trustees for the bondholders, examined the properties of the three leased railroads in the winter of 1874–5, once it became clear that the Atlantic and Great Western was insolvent and could not pay leases, with the idea of ascertaining whether the bondholders could obtain any revenue from the three. Most of the value of the properties lay in the Shenango and Allegheny and the coal lands of its subsidiary. Nonetheless, Swinburne attempted to salvage what he could from the other two companies, and in February 1875, installed a new board of directors. Henry S. Huidekoper, president of the Pithole Valley, was elected president of the Pennsylvania Petroleum as well. In February 1876, Huidekoper reported that the railroad had been levied by the sheriff for unpaid debts "over a year ago".

== Later history ==
The railroad was sold under foreclosure and reorganized on June 20, 1882, as the Petroleum Railway of Pennsylvania. Steele was again elected president, and D. W. Lockart of Titusville secretary. Directors were James T. Blair, Frank Dunning, Henry C. Bloss, Samuel Minor, Francis H. Gibbs, and J. H. Gray. Steele was also president and Blair general superintendent of the Shenango and Allegheny. All of the new railroad's stock was held by the Shenango Railway and Mercer Coal Company. At the March 1883 stockholder's meeting, a $500,000 mortgage was taken out to complete the railroad from Titusville to Erie. At the same time, Blair was made vice-president and I. D. Stinson treasurer.

The railroad was sold under foreclosure on January 31, 1887 and reorganized on March 23, 1887, as the Titusville, Cambridge and Lake Erie Railroad. In 1889, president Steele reported that grading was complete between Enterprise and Cambridge, and that the New York, Lake Erie and Western Railroad (the "Erie") was supporting the project. The company reported laying 1.5 miles (2.4 km) of track in 1890, from Titusville to a nearby tannery, and that the route from Titusville to Oleopolis, 50 miles, was graded; they optimistically projected that the line from Titusville east to Cambridge would soon be complete. (The 50 miles of grading included 7 miles of the abandoned grade of the Pithole Valley Railway from Pithole to Oleopolis.) The new line ran west from the Dunkirk, Allegheny Valley and Pittsburgh Railroad station in Titusville to the newly opened Queen City tannery of Lucius Beebe & Sons. On July 1, 1891, it was leased to the DAV&P for use as a siding to serve the tannery; the company's own reports notwithstanding, it was only 0.386 miles (0.621 km) long.

It was foreclosed on June 25, 1891, after a suit brought by James L. Magee, and reorganized under the same name on July 16. The Titusville, Cambridge and Lake Erie was again reorganized on April 1, 1901, as the Lake Erie Railway. Steele was again elected president, and Charles W. MacKey of Titusville became secretary. Steele died in New York on October 20, 1902.

The company was foreclosed on April 19, 1906, and reorganized on May 21 as the Erie and Central Pennsylvania Railway. This line was projected to extend not only from Erie to Tidioute, but to run further east to Punxsutawney, Pennsylvania, a distance of 150 miles (240 km). By 1913, MacKey had assumed the presidency, and now projected the line as an electric, rather than a steam, railroad, beginning with the opening of the line from Titusville to Cambridge Springs. The P. A. Velotta Construction Company, of Cleveland, was contracted to work on the line, and it was underway in July. It was expected to open in October or November. However, construction lagged: Velotta Construction defended itself from charges of sluggishness in a local newspaper, blaming infighting among the railroad's officials.

It was foreclosed on December 8, 1913 and sold to William H. Bonynge, of New York, who reorganized it on December 23 as the Titusville and Cambridge Railroad. Bonynge had been elected president of the company by 1916. It was reorganized on January 19, 1919, as the Titusville and Cambridge Springs Railroad. Bonynge remained president; the secretary was James R. Gahan and the treasurer T.J. McManus. Axtell J. Byles was one of the directors. Bonynge died in January 1921. He was not immediately replaced. The railroad last filed with the Pennsylvania Public Utility Commission in 1964. The New York Central abandoned the Dunkirk, Allegheny Valley and Pittsburgh and ceased operating over the Titusville and Cambridge in 1966.

== Bibliography ==
- Taber, Thomas T. III (1987). Railroads of Pennsylvania Encyclopedia and Atlas. Thomas T. Taber III. ISBN 0-9603398-5-X.
