= Jersey Bridge (Cherrytree Township, Pennsylvania) =

Listed on the NRHP in Venango County, Pennsylvania, United States

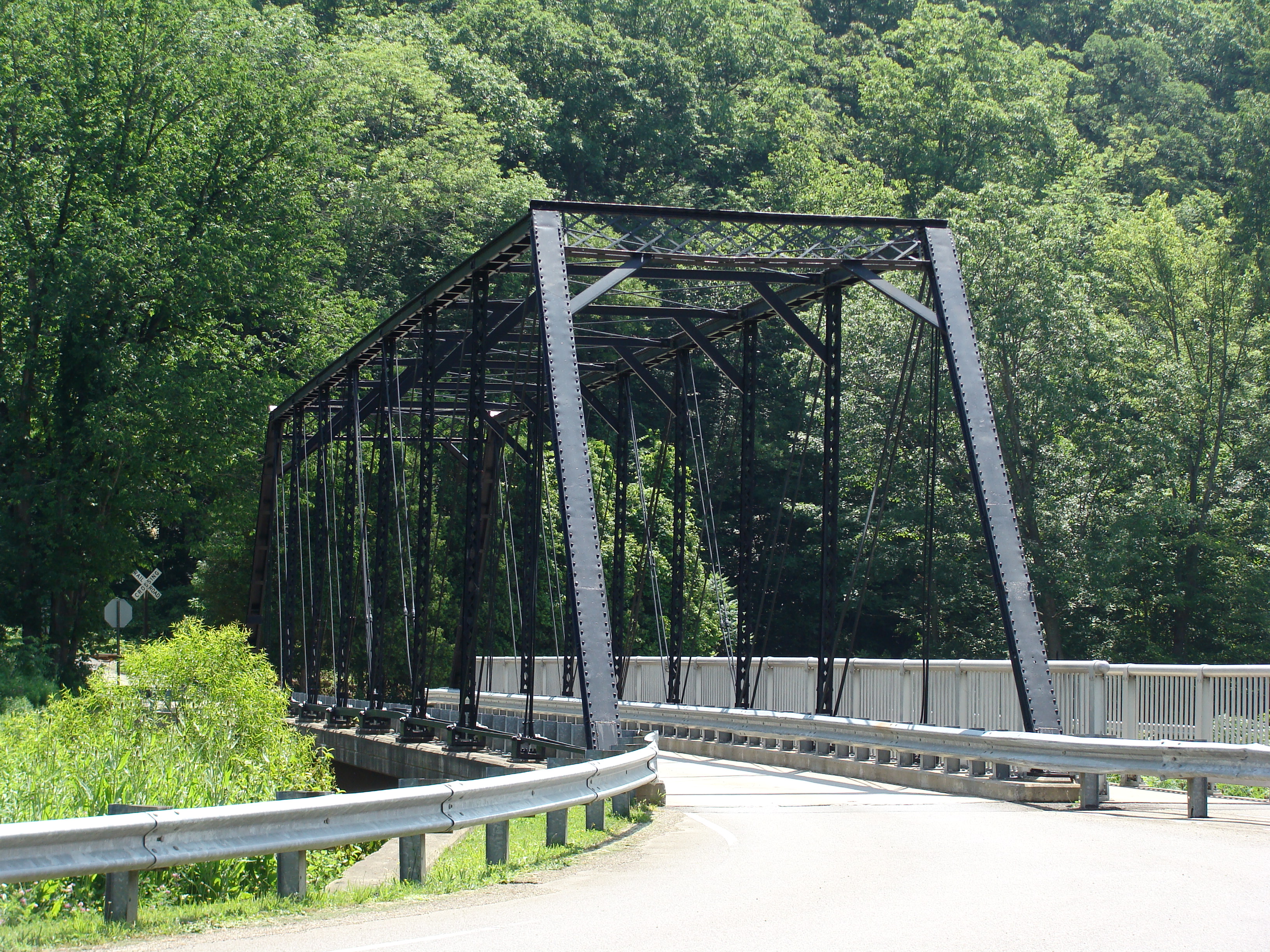
- The bridge in July 2011
- Coordinates: 41°36′55″N 79°39′27″W
- Carries: SR 1011
- Crosses: Oil Creek
- Locale: Venango County, Pennsylvania, U.S.
- Other name: Bridge in Cherrytree Township
- Maintained by: PennDOT
- NBI #: 601011001014800

Characteristics
- Total length: 42.7 m (140 ft)
- Width: 10.1 m (33 ft)

History
- Constructed by: Morse Bridge Company
- Built: 1882
- Jersey Bridge
- U.S. National Register of Historic Places
- MPS: Highway Bridges Owned by the Commonwealth of Pennsylvania, Department of Transportation TR
- NRHP reference No.: 88000809
- Added to NRHP: 22 June 1988

Location
- Interactive map of Jersey Bridge

The Jersey Bridge is a one-lane, Pratt through truss bridge that spans Oil Creek in Cherrytree Township, Pennsylvania. It connects the city of Titusville to the Drake Well Museum and Oil Creek State Park. The bridge was listed on the National Register of Historic Places in 1988. It was replaced in 1998 with a newer bridge that used the superstructure of the old bridge.

== History ==
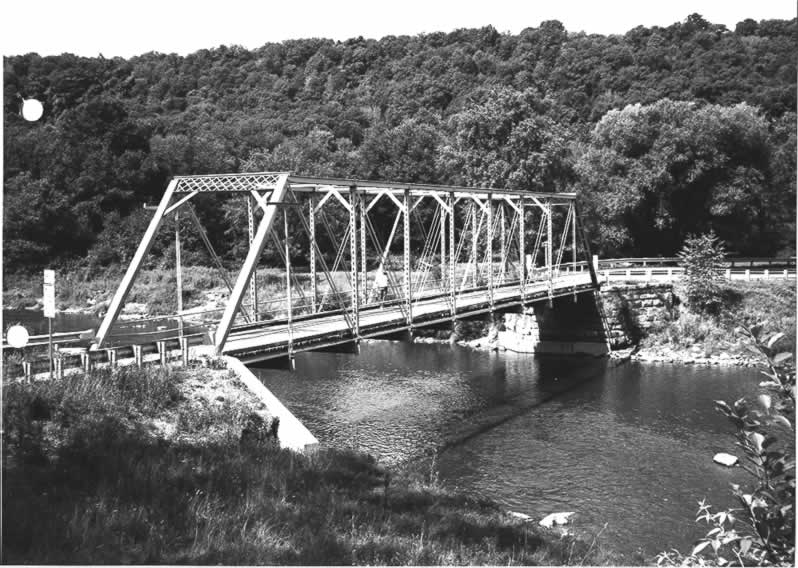
A Pennsylvania Department of Transportation photo of the bridge in 1982

The Jersey Bridge was constructed in 1882 by the Morse Bridge Company, the predecessor to American Bridge Company.

The Pennsylvania Department of Transportation (PennDOT) instituted a 10 short tons (9.1 t) weight limit for the bridge due to its deteriorating condition in 1979. It was listed on the National Register of Historic Places on June 22, 1988. The bridge was replaced in 1997 to meet safety requirements from PennDOT, as well as to allow tour buses heading to the nearby Drake Well Museum.

The replacement of the bridge, on the only route to and from museum, forced the museum to close on November 2, 1997. The museum was able to reopen in April 1998 after an agreement with the Oil Creek and Titusville Railroad, which operates a train station at the museum, to transport tourists from Titusville to Drake Well. The refurbished Jersey Bridge was reopened on May 27, 1998.

== Design ==
After it was rebuilt in 1998, the refurbished Jersey Bridge utilized the original bridge's superstructure, though the actual loadbearing substructure is a common girder bridge. The superstructure remained a pin-connected, Pratt through truss bridge. The bridge is still one-lane, but has a pedestrian walkway on one side of the bridge outside the superstructure.

== See also ==
- List of bridges on the National Register of Historic Places in Pennsylvania
- National Register of Historic Places listings in Venango County, Pennsylvania
