= Isaiah Frazier =

Isaiah N. Frazier (1823, Butler, Pennsylvania – June 24, 1864, New York City) was an oil speculator who in 1864 was the first to discover oil in what became Pithole City in Verango County, Pennsylvania. The legendary and largest oil boomtown grew almost overnight, its population reaching 20,000 in 2 years, only to then fall to under 2,000. Frazier had previously profited from an oil venture at nearby Cherry Run before he and his partner, James Faulkner, drilled Frazier Well (later renamed U. S. Well) at Pithole. Frazier formed United States Petroleum with wealthy Wall Street financier, J. Nelson Tappan, who became the company's president. Pithole was termed "Tappan's Mushroom City" by the New York Times.

Prior to his oil ventures, Frazier was a dry goods merchant in Allegheny City, Pennsylvania; Springfield, Missouri; and Iowa City, Iowa. He was a Presbyterian.

Frazier was the eldest son of James Frazier, a farmer and early settler of Butler County, Pennsylvania, having immigrated from County Armagh, Ireland. His mother was Maria Niblock, sister of Dr. Rev. Isaiah Niblock, a pioneer Presbyterian minister of Butler and the surrounding area. Frazier was the great-uncle of Rachel Carson, the environmentalist.

He married Keziah Walker, also of Butler. Frazier died in New York City.

== Notes ==
- Babcock, Charles A. (1919). Venango County Pennsylvania, Her Pioneers and People. J. H. Beers & Co., Chicago.
