= Pithole Stone Arch Bridge =

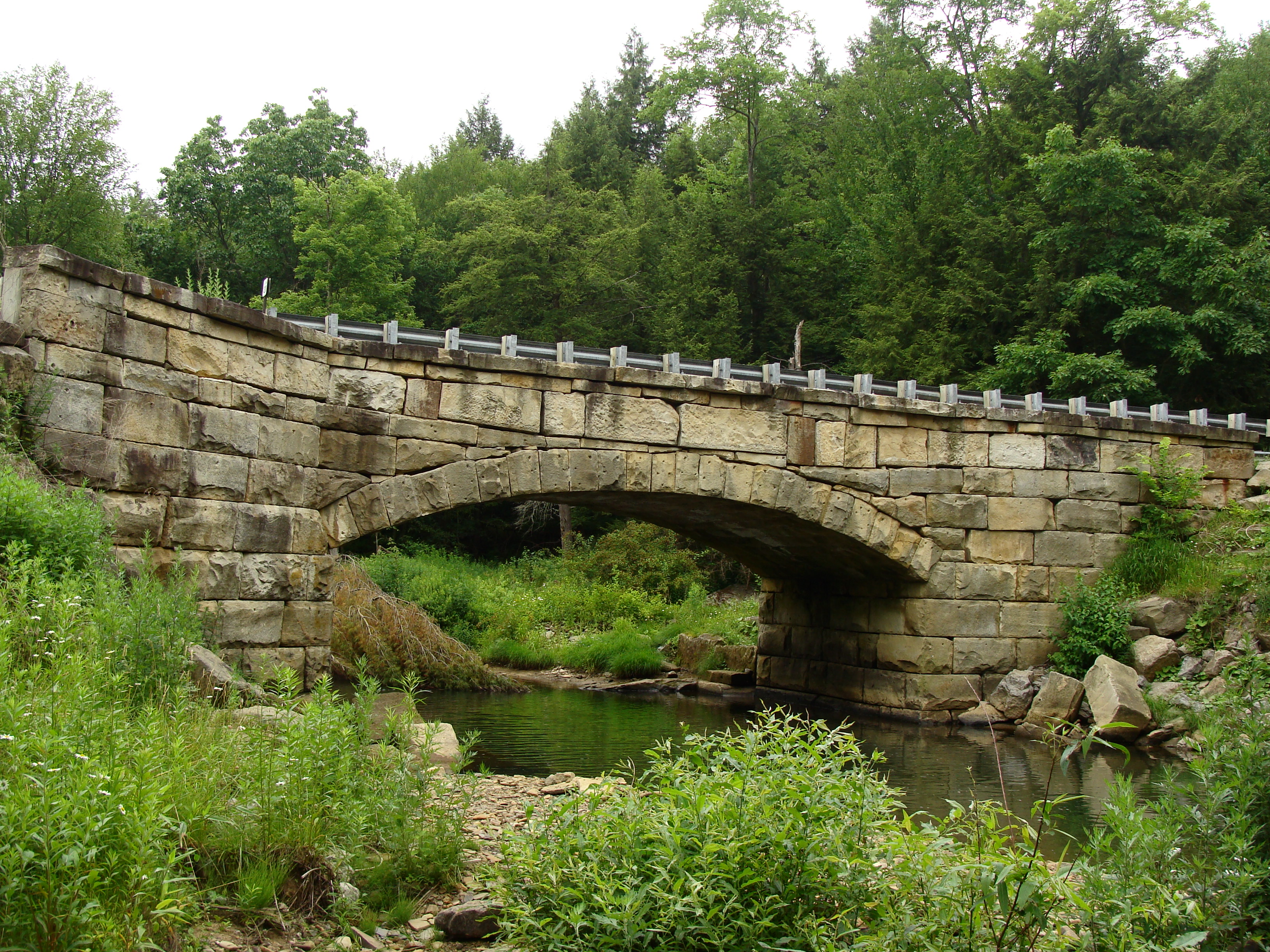
- Coordinates: 41°29′13″N 79°35′43″W
- Carries: Eagle Rock Road (SR 1004)
- Crosses: Pithole Creek
- Locale: Venango, Pennsylvania, United States
- Maintained by: PennDOT
- NBI #: 601004012000000

Characteristics
- Total length: 11.3 m (37 ft)
- Width: 5.2 m (17 ft)
- Load limit: 88 short tons (80 t)

History
- Constructed by: Richard. A. Bigley
- Built: January 3, 1899
- Pithole Stone Arch Bridge
- U.S. National Register of Historic Places
- MPS: Highway Bridges Owned by the Commonwealth of Pennsylvania, Department of Transportation TR
- NRHP reference No.: 88000869
- Added to NRHP: June 22, 1988

Location
- Interactive map of Pithole Stone Arch Bridge

The Pithole Stone Arch Bridge is a 37-foot (11 m) masonry, deck arch bridge that spans Pithole Creek between Cornplanter and President Townships, Venango County in the U.S. state of Pennsylvania. The bridge was listed on the National Register of Historic Places in 1988 and was documented by the Historic American Engineering Record (HAER) in 1997.

== History ==
On August 23, 1897, residents of Cornplanter and President Townships petitioned Venango County to construct a bridge over Pithole Creek. It was decided that the county would assist the township by constructing the stone abutments and iron superstructure, signing a contract to that effect on June 15, 1898. However, Venango County awarded a contract for a "stone bridge over Pithole Creek" to stonemason Richard A. Bigley a month later. The bridge was deemed completed on January 3, 1899, however observers of the construction felt that the bridge was not built to specifications and would need to be eventually replaced. The observer, who cited concerns about inferior mortar and that the arch was not large enough to accommodate floodwaters, demanded that Bigley be docked $50. The accusations were eventually withdrawn and Bigley received payment for the bridge—minus the $50 that was withheld by the county.

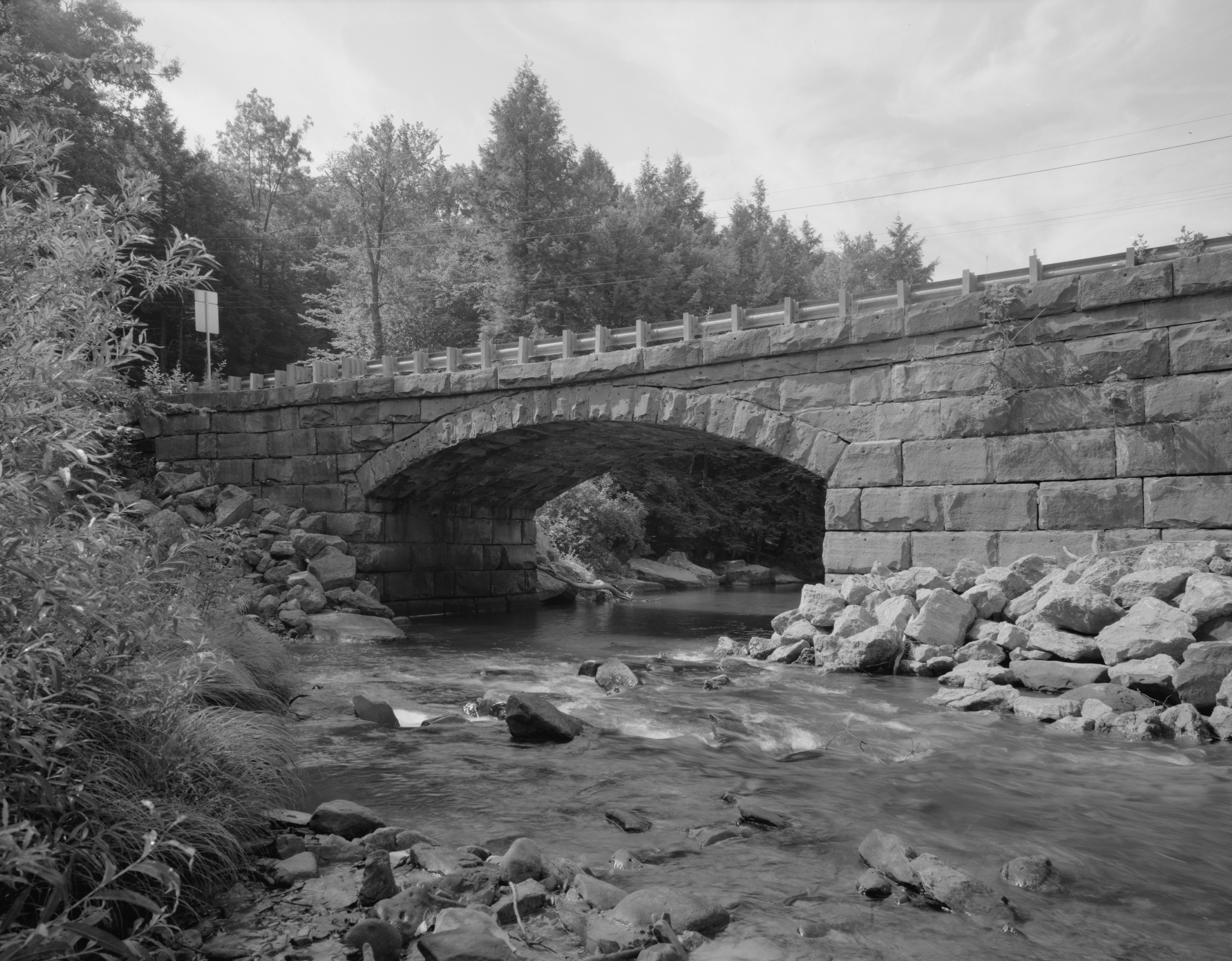
HAER photo of the bridge in 1997

The bridge was owned by both townships until 1935, when the Pennsylvania General Assembly passed an act turning over ownership of bridges on state routes to the predecessor to the Pennsylvania Department of Transportation (PennDOT). One of the wing walls was replaced in 1949. The bridge was listed on the National Register of Historic Places on June 22, 1988 and was documented by the Historic American Engineering Record in the summer of 1997.

== Design ==
The Pithole Stone Arch Bridge is a segmental arch bridge, spanning 37 feet (11 m) over Pithole Creek. The bridge is unusual for its short span and a flat arch that rises only 6 feet 7 inches (2.0 m). Also unusual are the bridge's massive abutments and for its being well-built for only a rural backroad. The bridge was constructed using ashlar that was "coursed", meaning each successive layer of stone had a different height, but the stone in each layer had the same height. A total of 628 square perches (15,543 ft^{2}; 1,444 m^{2}) of sandstone were used in the bridge.

== See also ==
- List of bridges documented by the Historic American Engineering Record in Pennsylvania
- List of bridges on the National Register of Historic Places in Pennsylvania
- National Register of Historic Places listings in Venango County, Pennsylvania
