= Dunkirk, Allegheny Valley and Pittsburgh Railroad =

Historic railroad line operated in PA and NY

Map

The Dunkirk, Allegheny Valley and Pittsburgh Railroad is a historic railroad company that operated in Pennsylvania and New York.

Chartered in 1867, its first passenger train ran in 1871. After several mergers and name changes, it was leased to the New York Central and Hudson River RR in 1873 for a term of 501 years. It was later wholly absorbed by the New York Central. Passenger service ceased in 1937. Only a few structures built by the company are extant.

== Early history ==
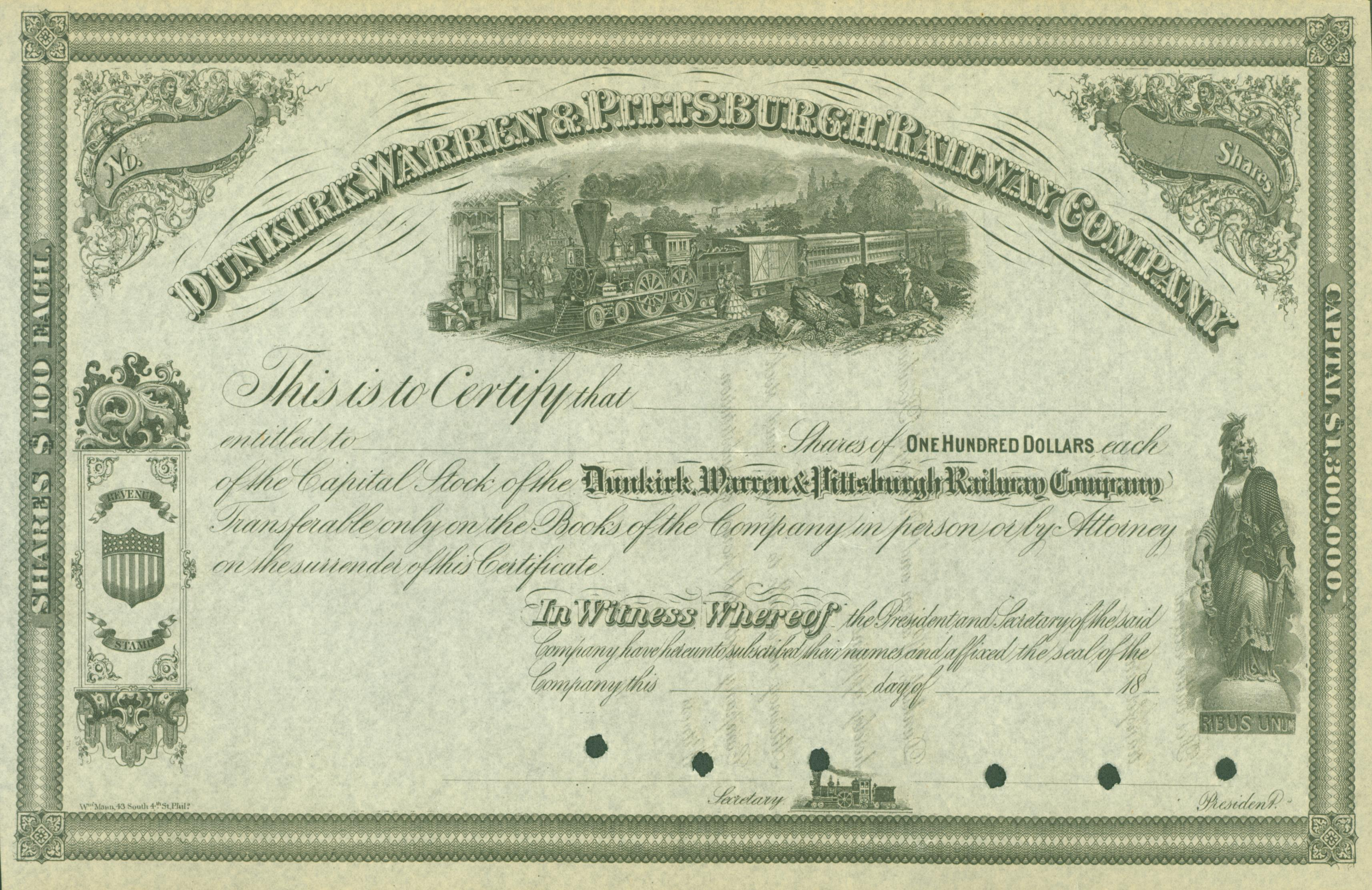
Share of the Dunkirk, Warren & Pittsburgh Railway Company, unissued

Begun as an idea of the businessmen of Warren, Pennsylvania about 1833 to build a railway following the Conewango River valley north toward Lake Erie. The idea produced no action until 1853, when 1700 shares of stock were sold, but it wasn't until the winter of 1866 that several influential men of Chautauqua County, New York started stoking the fires of progress. By April 1867, the New York State Legislature issued a charter for the Dunkirk, Warren & Pittsburgh Railroad Company to sell stock, and on June 17, 1867 that actual work began. The first passenger train ran over the line on June 22, 1871, from Dunkirk, New York to at least Falconer, New York.

The Dunkirk, Allegheny (sometimes spelled "Allegany") and Pittsburgh incorporated on December 31, 1872 as a merger of the Dunkirk, Warren and Pittsburgh Railway Company and the Warren and Venango Railroad Company. Four days after incorporation, on January 3, 1873, the DAV&P was leased to the New York Central and Hudson River RR for a term of 501 years.

== 1897 Financial Statement ==
D. A. V. & P. RAILROAD COMPANY
Regular Annual Report to the State Railroad Commission
Bureau of The Journal
467 Broadway
Albany, Sept. 16, 1897

The regular annual report of the Dunkirk, Allegheny Valley & Pittsburg railroad company for the year ending June 10, has been filed with the state railroad commission. The report shows
Gross earnings: $206,851 50
Operating expenses: 199,105 42
Net earnings: 7,746 08
Other income: 221 25
Gross income: 7,967 33
Fixed charges: 13,307 34
Net deficit: 5,339 91

The general balance sheet shows assets of $4,577,006.67, including $4,541,486.67, for cost of road and equipment; $10,562.74 cash on hand. The liabilities include $1,300,000 capital stock; $2,900,00 funded debt and $49,628.80 profit and loss surplus.

== Service history ==
The DAV&P railroad connected with the Lake Shore and Michigan Southern Railway (later a part of the New York Central System); the New York, Chicago and Saint Louis Railroad (aka "Nickel Plate") in Dunkirk; the Erie Railroad in Jamestown, New York; the Philadelphia and Erie Railroad in Warren, Pennsylvania (later the Pennsylvania Railroad) and Pennsylvania Railroad in Titusville, Pennsylvania. A blueprint of the Titusville terminus in 1901 shows the DAVP main line become the Titusville, Cambridge and Lake Erie Railroad just west of the DAVP Titusville Station. Originally intended to connect Erie with the Pennsylvania oil fields, the small amount of track it laid became a siding used by the DAVP to serve the Queen City Tannery.

A 1921 list of industries served by the DAVP, shows a wide variety of products moved by the railroad, including lumber, coal, oil, ice, produce, canned goods, grains, cattle, foundry goods, chemicals, etc. Maps of each station and siding in 1901 were posted to the internet as of 2014.

At some point, the DAV&P became wholly owned by the NYC, motive power bore the NYC logo, and as of 1968, Penn Central, though the line was still known as the "DAV&P", or "Dolly Varden", or "Valley Branch".

Except for a brief revival during WWII, regular passenger service was dropped in 1937. Freight traffic continued along the length of the line through 1972 when the rail line was abandoned from Cassadaga, New York to Falconer, New York due to a bridge washout just west of the village of Sinclairville, New York in the wake of Hurricane Agnes. Thereafter, Penn Central ran weekly turns between Warren and Falconer.

With the formation of Conrail, service was further cut from North Warren to Falconer. In the mid to late 1980s, the Allegheny & Eastern Railroad took over operations on the line from Warren to North Warren. The A&E served this section of the line until the early 1990s. Today, this portion is a rail trail.

Most rails were removed from the line in the late 1970s. The segment between Titusville, Pennsylvania and Warren, Pennsylvania was removed in 1969. A few small portions of the line still exist, including a short spur off the Dunkirk mainline of the former Lake Shore & Michigan Southern Railway / NYC (Penn Central/Conrail, now CSX) to Fredonia to serve the former Red Wing (?-1999) / Carriage House Foods (1999-2010) / ConAgra (2010–2015) manufacturing plant just north of U.S. Route 20 in Fredonia. However, this segment was cut off at Williams Street in Dunkirk NY in 2021 and is thus isolated from any other tracks. A small spur less than a mile long to serve a plastics company in Warren, Pennsylvania remains . An additional active segment is operated by the Oil Creek & Titusville Railroad from the former PRR-DAVP junction near the Pennsylvania Railroad station in Titusville to an industrial customer just east of the Route 27 crossing.

The DAV&P Fredonia Depot and freight house sit just south of Route 20, but are suffering from neglect, the freight house being in better shape, having been used as a warehouse for a few years by a local business. North Warren Station (Pennsylvania) along the east side of U.S. Route 62, just north of the City of Warren, was a restaurant as of the spring of 2018. Two smaller stations which were once the stations for Cassadaga and Lily Dale are now combined to be one building, hardly recognizable, in Cassadaga, New York, part of a campground. The former DAVP freight station stands in good condition (2018) in Warren, Pennsylvania as well, though a freight station in Falconer, New York was torn down in 2006.
