= President Township, Pennsylvania =

Township in Pennsylvania, US

Coordinates: 41°31′00″N 79°33′59″W

President Township, Venango County, Pennsylvania
- Township
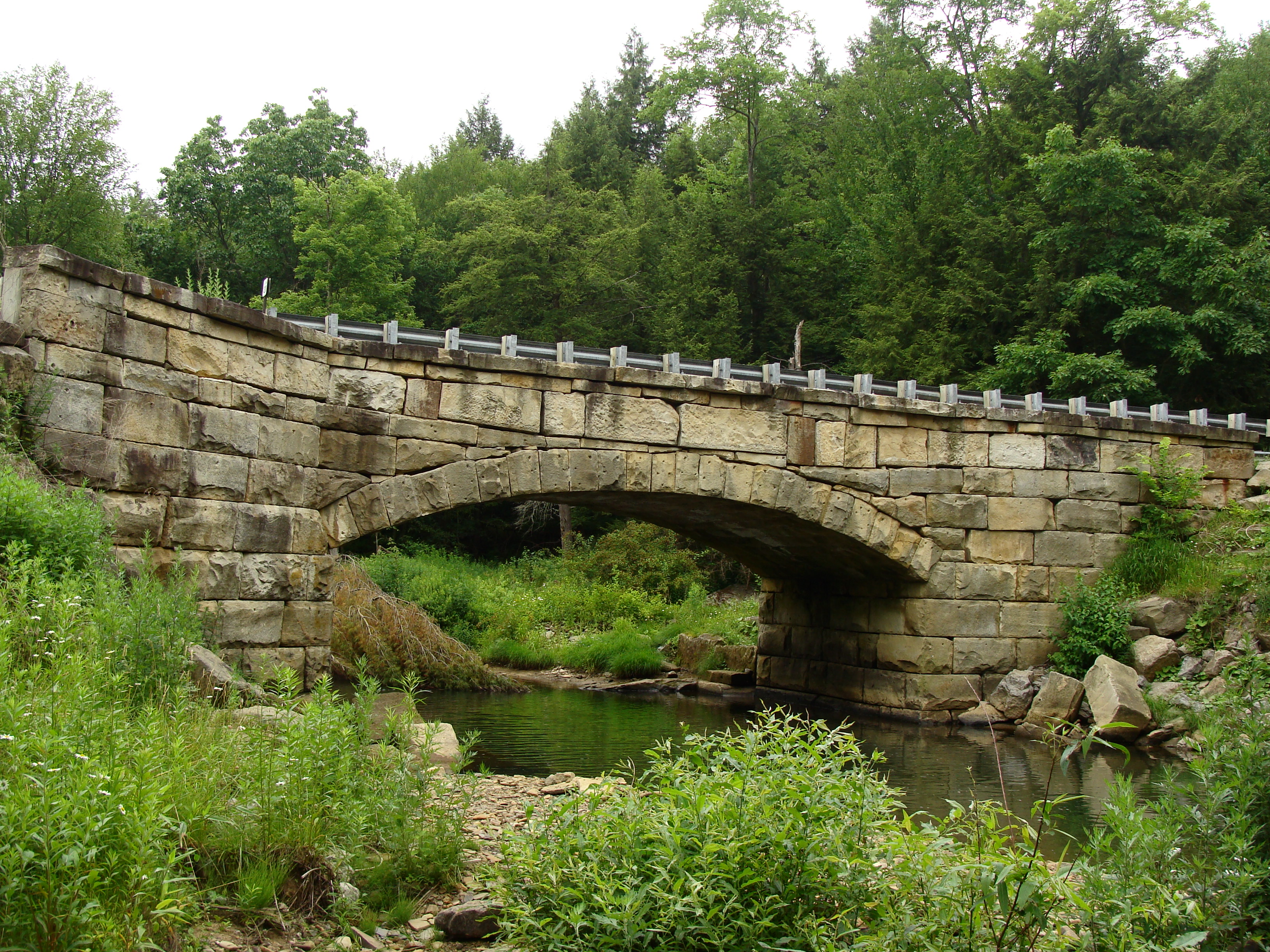
- Pithole Stone Arch Bridge

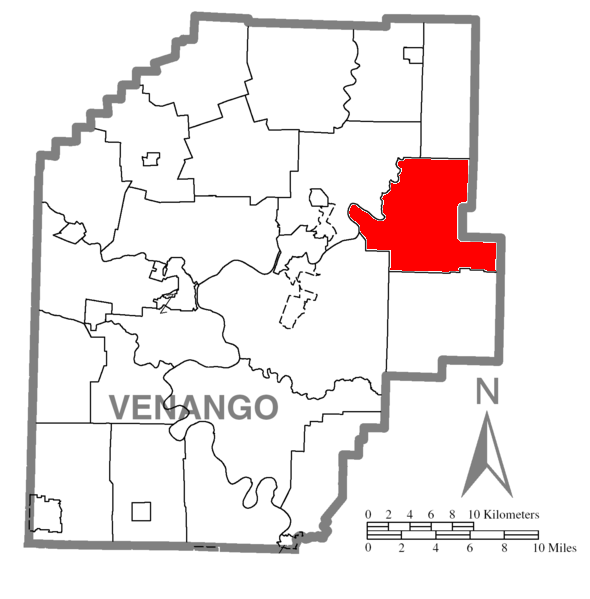
- Map of Venango County, Pennsylvania highlighting President Township

- Map of Venango County, Pennsylvania
- Country: United States
- State: Pennsylvania
- County: Venango
- Settled: 1798
- Incorporated: 1850

Government
  - Type: Board of Supervisors

Area
  - Total: 38.91 sq mi (100.78 km^{2})
  - Land: 37.79 sq mi (97.88 km^{2})
  - Water: 1.12 sq mi (2.91 km^{2})

Population (2020)
  - Total: 451 ▼
  - Estimate (2024): 440
  - Density: 13.7/sq mi (5.28/km^{2})
- Time zone: UTC-5 (Eastern (EST))
  - Summer (DST): UTC-4 (EDT)
- Area code: 814
- FIPS code: 42-121-62544

President Township is a township in Venango County, Pennsylvania, United States. The population was 451 at the 2020 census, a decrease from 540 in 2010, which represented, in turn, a decrease from the figure of 543 at the 2000 census. It is located at the confluence of the Hemlock Creek and Allegheny River, and is largely made up of seasonal/recreational camps and cottages, which are situated near state gamelands.

== History ==
The Pithole Stone Arch Bridge was listed on the National Register of Historic Places in 1988.

== Geography ==
According to the United States Census Bureau, the township has a total area of 38.5 square miles (99.6 km^{2}), of which 37.4 square miles (96.8 km^{2}) is land and 1.1 square miles (2.8 km^{2}) (2.78%) is water.

== Demographics ==
Historical population
Census	Pop.	Note	%±
2000	543		—
2010	540		−0.6%
2020	451		−16.5%
2024 (est.)	440		−2.4%
U.S. Decennial Census

As of the census of 2000, there were 543 people, 241 households, and 162 families residing in the township. The population density was 14.5 people per square mile (5.6/km^{2}). There were 719 housing units at an average density of 19.2/sq mi (7.4/km^{2}). The racial makeup of the township was 99.45% White, 0.18% African American, 0.18% Asian, and 0.18% from two or more races.

There were 241 households, out of which 22.4% had children under the age of 18 living with them, 58.5% were married couples living together, 7.1% had a female householder with no husband present, and 32.4% were non-families. 29.5% of all households were made up of individuals, and 13.3% had someone living alone who was 65 years of age or older. The average household size was 2.25 and the average family size was 2.75.

In the township the population was spread out, with 20.1% under the age of 18, 6.3% from 18 to 24, 22.5% from 25 to 44, 27.8% from 45 to 64, and 23.4% who were 65 years of age or older. The median age was 46 years. For every 100 females, there were 101.1 males. For every 100 females age 18 and over, there were 96.4 males.

The median income for a household in the township was $26,172, and the median income for a family was $30,962. Males had a median income of $25,000 versus $21,752 for females. The per capita income for the township was $14,713. About 13.0% of families and 13.9% of the population were below the poverty line, including 29.1% of those under age 18 and 2.5% of those age 65 or over.

== Education ==
Most of President Township is in Forest Area School District while a portion is in Oil City Area School District.
