= Cherrytree Township, Pennsylvania =

Township in Pennsylvania, US

Coordinates: 41°36′00″N 79°45′59″W

Titusville
- Township
- Cherrytree Township, Venango County, Pennsylvania
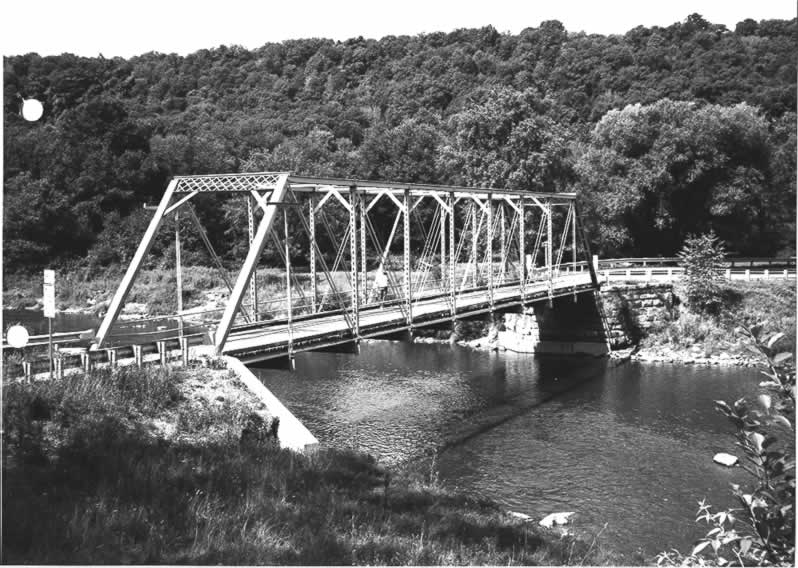
- This 1882 bridge over Oil Creek is on the National Register of Historic Places

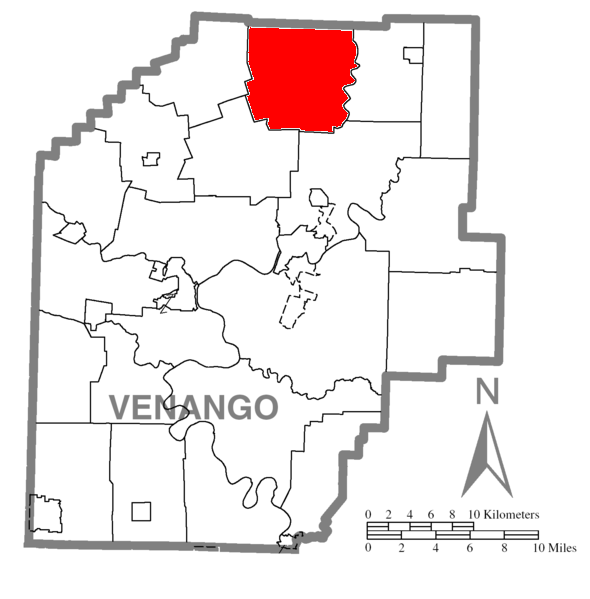
- Map of Venango County, Pennsylvania highlighting Cherrytree Township

- Map of Venango County, Pennsylvania
- Country: United States
- State: Pennsylvania
- County: Venango
- Settled: 1797
- Incorporated: 1817

Government City of Titusville
  - Type: Board of Supervisors

Area
  - Total: 36.70 sq mi (95.05 km^{2})
  - Land: 36.70 sq mi (95.05 km^{2})
  - Water: 0 sq mi (0.00 km^{2})

Population (2020)
  - Total: 1,306 ▼
  - Estimate (2024): 1,270
  - Density: 40.0/sq mi (15.46/km^{2})
- Time zone: UTC-5 (Eastern (EST))
  - Summer (DST): UTC-4 (EDT)
- Area code: 814
- FIPS code: 42-121-13136
- Website: www.cherrytreetwp.com

Cherrytree Township is a township in Venango County, Pennsylvania, United States. The population was 1,306 at the 2020 census, a decrease from 1,973 in 2010. It is part of Titusville.

== History ==
The Bridge in Cherrytree Township and Drake Oil Well are listed on the National Register of Historic Places.

== Geography ==
According to the United States Census Bureau, the township has a total area of 36.8 square miles (95 km^{2}), all land.

== Demographics ==
Historical population
| Census | Pop. | Note | %± |
|---|---|---|---|
| 2000 | 1,543 | | — |
| 2010 | 1,540 | | −0.2% |
| 2020 | 1,306 | | −15.2% |
| 2024 (est.) | 1,270 | | −2.8% |
U.S. Decennial Census

At the 2000 census, there were 1,543 people, 593 households, and 451 families residing in the township. The population density was 41.9 inhabitants per square mile (16.2/km^{2}). There were 671 housing units at an average density of 18.2/sq mi (7.0/km^{2}). The racial makeup of the township was 99.16% White, 0.06% African American, 0.26% Native American, 0.13% Asian, 0.06% from other races, and 0.32% from two or more races. Hispanic or Latino of any race were 0.26% of the population.

There were 593 households, of which 32.5% had children under the age of 18 living with them, 63.6% were married couples living together, 6.7% had a female householder with no husband present, and 23.9% were non-families. 20.4% of all households were made up of individuals, and 9.1% had someone living alone who was 65 years of age or older. The average household size was 2.60 and the average family size was 2.98.

Age distribution was 24.8% under the age of 18, 5.6% from 18 to 24, 27.5% from 25 to 44, 26.7% from 45 to 64, and 15.3% who were 65 years of age or older. The median age was 40 years. For every 100 females, there were 105.5 males. For every 100 females age 18 and over, there were 101.4 males.

The median household income was $36,193, and the median family income was $39,559. Males had a median income of $29,583 versus $21,438 for females. The per capita income for the township was $16,176. About 6.6% of families and 7.5% of the population were below the poverty line, including 9.4% of those under age 18 and 10.5% of those age 65 or over.

== Notable people ==
- Lyman Stewart, businessman
- Milton Stewart, businessman
