= Plumer Block =

- Formerly listed on the U.S. National Register of Historic Places
- Location: 1205 Liberty St., Franklin, Pennsylvania
- Area: 0.3 acres (0.12 ha)
- Built: 1866
- Built by: Plumer, Arnold
- Architectural style: Italianate
- NRHP reference No.: 78002476

Significant dates
- Added to NRHP: 1978
- Removed from NRHP: June 27, 1986

Plumer Block, also known as the Hancock Building, was an historic commercial building that was located in Franklin, Venango County, Pennsylvania, United States.

It was listed on the National Register of Historic Places in 1978. It was delisted in 1986, after being demolished following a fire.

== History and architectural features ==
Built in 1866, this historic structure was a three-story, red brick building with a flat roof that was in the Victorian Italianate style. It housed the first bank in Franklin, as well as numerous commercial enterprises and law offices.

It was listed on the National Register of Historic Places in 1978. It was delisted in 1986, after being demolished following a fire.
