= Cornplanter Township, Pennsylvania =

Township in Pennsylvania, US

Cornplanter Township
- Township
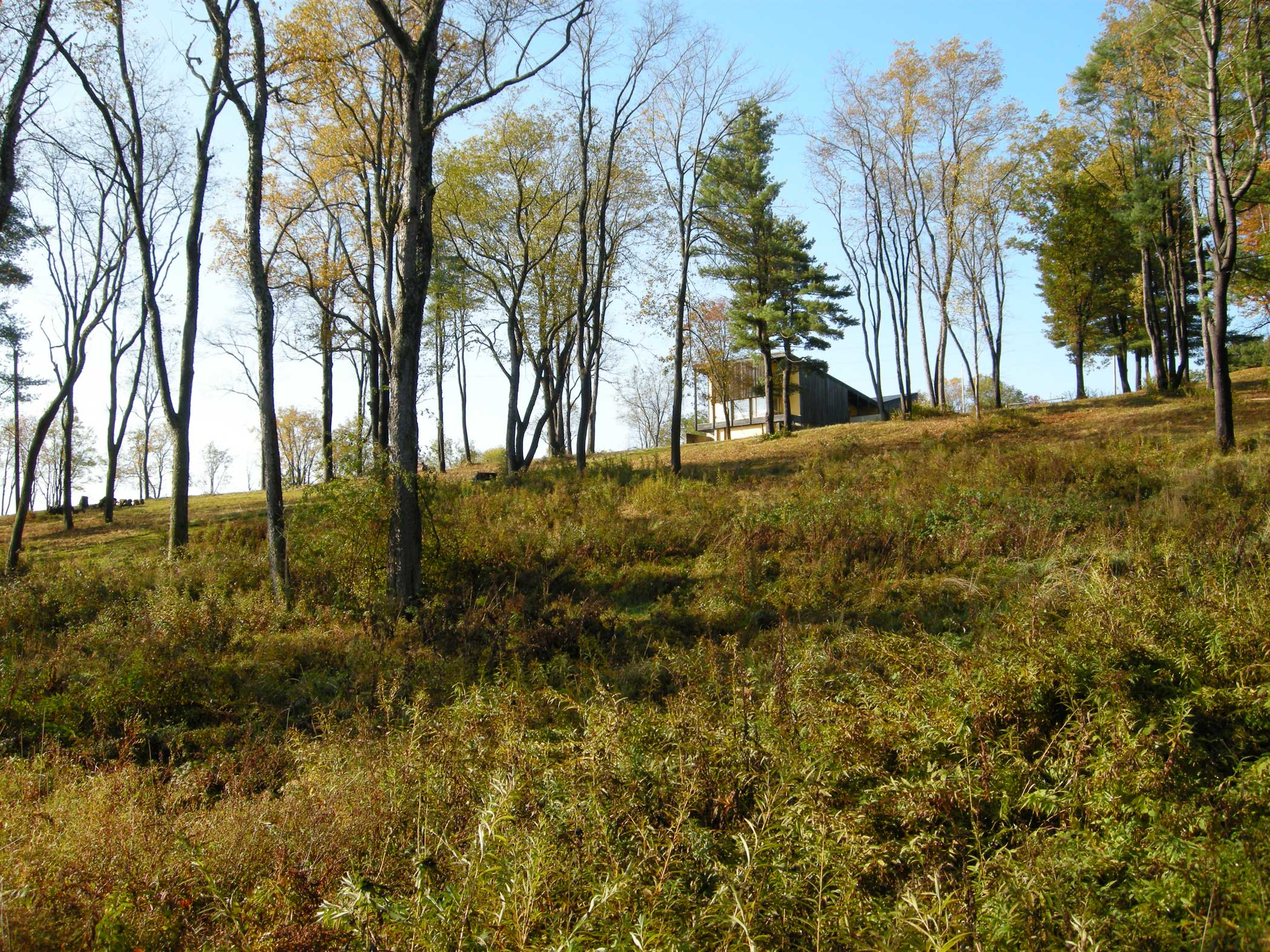
- The ghost town of Pithole in Cornplanter Township

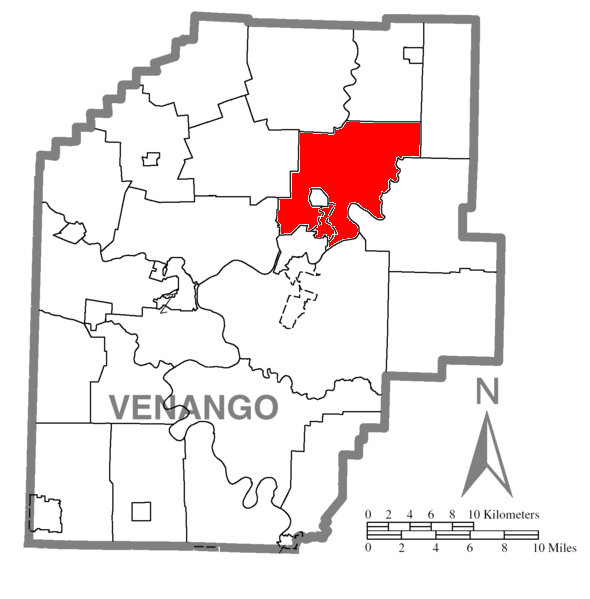
- Map of Venango County highlighting Cornplanter Township
- Coordinates: 41°31′0″N 79°35′59″W
- Country: United States
- State: Pennsylvania
- County: Venango
- Settled: 1795
- Incorporated: November 28, 1833
- Named for: Cornplanter, a Seneca war-chief

Government
  - Type: Board of Supervisors

Area
  - Total: 37.99 sq mi (98.39 km^{2})
  - Land: 37.44 sq mi (96.98 km^{2})
  - Water: 0.54 sq mi (1.41 km^{2})

Population (2020)
  - Total: 2,320 ▼
  - Estimate (2024): 2,271
  - Density: 62.1/sq mi (23.97/km^{2})
- Time zone: UTC-5 (Eastern (EST))
  - Summer (DST): UTC-4 (EDT)
- Area code: 814
- FIPS code: 42-121-16232
- Website: cornplantertownship.net

Cornplanter Township is a township in Venango County, Pennsylvania, United States. The population was 2,320 at the 2020 census, a decrease from 2,487 at the 2010 and 2,687 at the 2000 census.

== History ==
McClintocksville was a small community in Cornplanter Township in Venango County, Pennsylvania. In 1861, it was the site of Wamsutta Oil Refinery, the first business venture of Henry Huttleston Rogers, who became a leading United States capitalist, businessman, industrialist, financier, and philanthropist. Rogers and his young wife Abbie Palmer Gifford Rogers lived in a one-room shack there along Oil Creek for several years.

Shortly later, Rogers met oil pioneer Charles Pratt who purchased the entire output of the tiny Wamsutta Oil Refinery. In 1867, Rogers joined Pratt in forming Charles Pratt and Company, which was purchased by Standard Oil in 1874. Rogers became one of the key men in John D. Rockefeller’s Standard Oil Trust.

After joining Standard Oil, Rogers invested heavily in various industries, including copper, steel, mining, and railways. The Virginian Railway is widely considered his final life's achievement. Rogers amassed a great fortune, estimated at over $100 million, and became one of the wealthiest men in the United States.

He was also a generous philanthropist, providing many public works for his hometown of Fairhaven, Massachusetts and financially assisting helping such notables as Mark Twain, Helen Keller, and Booker T. Washington.

The Pithole Stone Arch Bridge and Site of Pithole City are listed on the National Register of Historic Places.

== Geography ==
According to the United States Census Bureau, the township has a total area of 37.8 square miles (98 km^{2}), of which 37.3 square miles (97 km^{2}) is land and 0.5 square miles (1.3 km^{2}) (1.30%) is water. Part of the Oil Creek State Park is located here, as is the census-designated place of Hasson Heights.

== Demographics ==
Historical population
Census	Pop.	Note	%±
2000	2,687		—
2010	2,418		−10.0%
2020	2,320		−4.1%
2024 (est.)	2,271		−2.1%
U.S. Decennial Census

As of the census of 2000, there were 2,687 people, 1,034 households, and 767 families residing in the township. The population density was 72.0 inhabitants per square mile (27.8/km^{2}). There were 1,179 housing units at an average density of 31.6 per square mile (12.2/km^{2}). The racial makeup of the township was 98.81% White, 0.41% African American, 0.07% Native American, 0.04% Asian, 0.04% from other races, and 0.63% from two or more races. Hispanic or Latino of any race were 0.33% of the population.

There were 1,034 households, out of which 30.8% had children under the age of 18 living with them, 62.4% were married couples living together, 7.4% had a female householder with no husband present, and 25.8% were non-families. 23.0% of all households were made up of individuals, and 11.4% had someone living alone who was 65 years of age or older. The average household size was 2.49 and the average family size was 2.91.

In the township the population was spread out, with 24.1% under the age of 18, 5.1% from 18 to 24, 25.3% from 25 to 44, 25.6% from 45 to 64, and 20.0% who were 65 years of age or older. The median age was 42 years. For every 100 females, there were 94.0 males. For every 100 females age 18 and over, there were 91.4 males.

The median income for a household in the township was $36,066, and the median income for a family was $48,259. Males had a median income of $33,750 versus $23,182 for females. The per capita income for the township was $18,532. About 7.5% of families and 10.1% of the population were below the poverty line, including 14.2% of those under age 18 and 7.4% of those age 65 or over.
