= Stewart Run (Indian Creek tributary) =

Stream in West Virginia, U.S.

Coordinates: 39°34′53″N 80°06′18″W

Stewart Run is a stream in the U.S. state of West Virginia. It is a tributary of Indian Creek.

Stewart Run was named after John Stewart, a pioneer settler.

== See also ==
- List of rivers of West Virginia
