= Pithole Creek =

Pithole Creek Tributary to Allegheny River
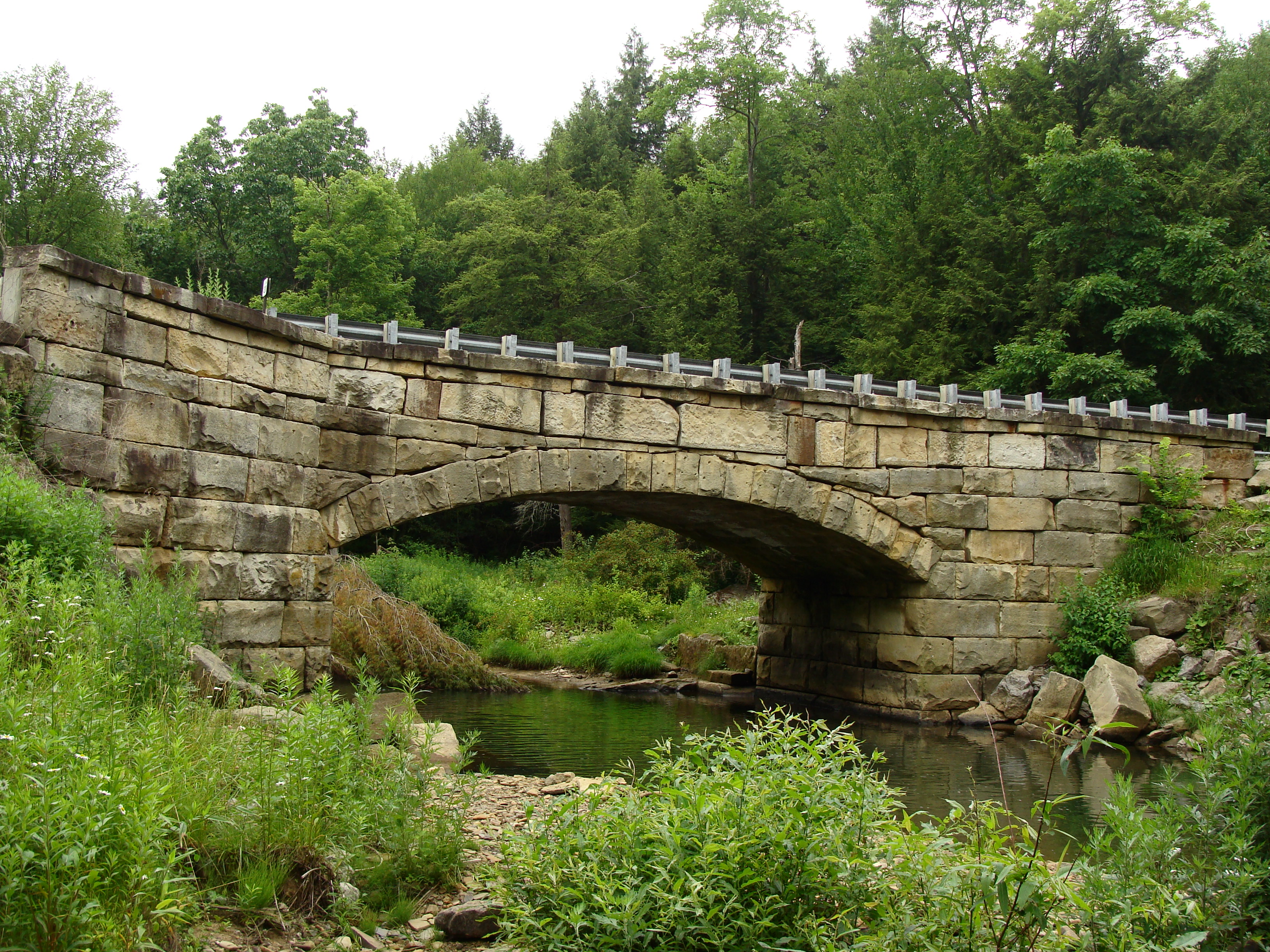
- Pithole Creek at the Pithole Stone Arch Bridge

- Location of the mouth of Pithole Creek in Pennsylvania

Location
- Country: United States
- State: Pennsylvania
- Counties: Forest, Venango

Physical characteristics
- Source
  - location: Stewart Run, Forest County, Pennsylvania
  - coordinates: 41°37′20″N 79°29′38″W
  - elevation: 1,720 ft (520 m)
- Mouth: Allegheny River
  - location: Oleopolis, Venango County, Pennsylvania
  - coordinates: 41°27′23″N 79°36′35″W
  - elevation: 1,010 ft (310 m)
- Length: 17.1 mi (27.5 km)
- Basin size: 41.8 sq mi (108 km^{2})
- Discharge
  - location: Allegheny River
  - average: 74.06 cu ft/s (2.097 m^{3}/s) at mouth with Allegheny River

Basin features
- Tributaries
  - left: Simmons Run
  - right: Woodcock Run; Schoolhouse Run; W Pithole Creek; Allender Run

Pithole Creek is a 17.1-mile (27.5 km) tributary of the Allegheny River in Northwest Pennsylvania in the United States. It has a drainage area of 41.8 square miles (108 km^{2}).

Pithole Creek joins the Allegheny River approximately 0.5 miles (0.80 km) upstream of Oleopolis.

== See also ==
- List of rivers of Pennsylvania
- List of tributaries of the Allegheny River
