= Stewart Run (Octoraro Creek tributary) =

Coordinates: 39°51′12″N 76°06′46″W

Stewart Run is a tributary of the West Branch Octoraro Creek in Lancaster County, Pennsylvania, in the United States. It is approximately 4.9 miles (7.9 km) long and flows through Colerain Township and East Drumore Township.

== Course ==
Stewart Run rises in a small valley and flows west. It passes under US Route 222 near Solanco High School before turning southwest. The stream receives two small unnamed tributaries from the right and turns south for several tenths of a mile. It receives an unnamed tributary from the left. It turns southwest and receives another tributary from the left before its confluence with West Branch Octoraro Creek.

Stewart Run joins the West Branch Octoraro Creek 6.15 miles (9.90 km) upriver of its mouth.

== Geography and geology ==
The elevation near the mouth of Stewart Run is 358 feet (109 m) above sea level. The elevation of the creek's source is between 660 and 640 feet (200 and 200 m) above sea level.

The stream's watershed is part of the Piedmont region, characterized by rolling hills. The lower 2 miles (3 km) of the stream is designated a Scenic River.

== Watershed ==
The watershed of Stewart Run has an area of 5.87 square miles (15.2 km^{2}). Its mouth is in the United States Geological Survey quadrangle of Kirkwood. Its source is in the quadrangle of Wakefield. Most of the watershed is in an agricultural area. There are several waterfalls on the creek.

== History ==
Stewart Run was entered into the Geographic Names Information System on August 2, 1979. Its identifier in the Geographic Names Information System is 1188650.

== Biology and recreation ==
The Theodore A. Parker III Natural Area, a 100-acre park named after the famed ornithologist, is adjacent to the creek. Several hiking trails in the park follow the creek. Fishing is allowed within designated seasons. Stewart Run supports flora including trout lilies, violets, mayapple, club mosses, ground pine, ferns and lichens. Animals in the watershed include birds, deer, raccoons, opossums, and brown and brook trout.

== See also ==
- List of Pennsylvania rivers
