= Pennsylvania oil rush =

1859–1870s event in the United States

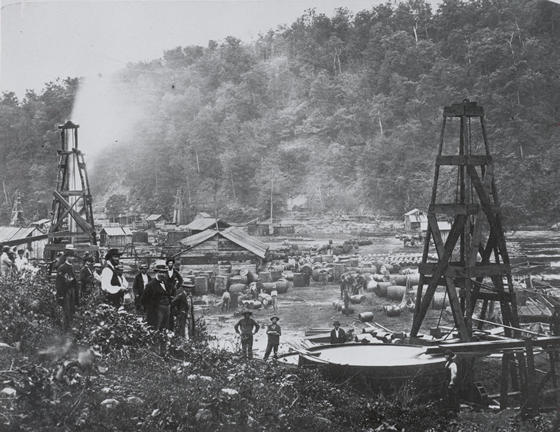
A Pennsylvania oil field in 1862

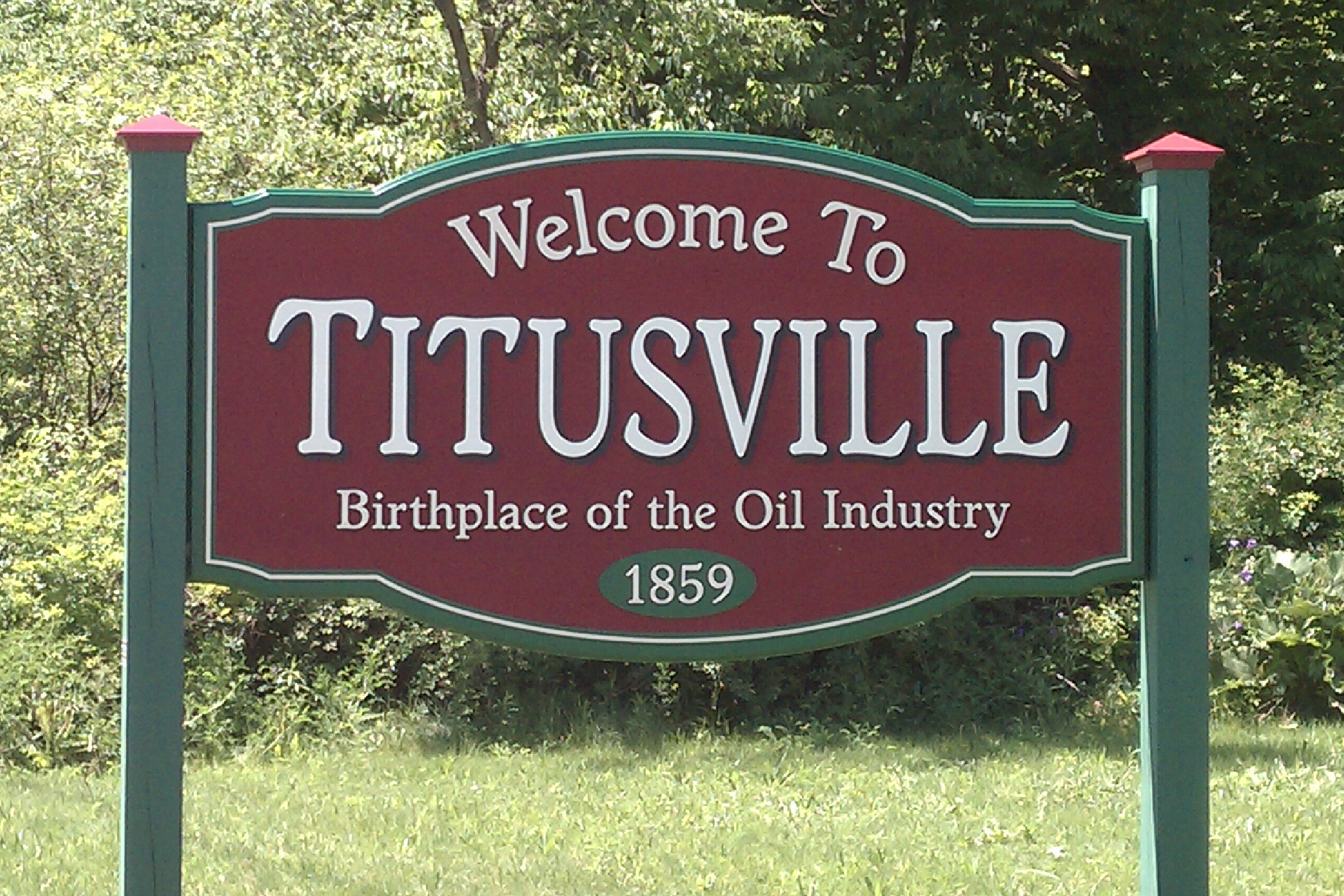
Welcome sign to Titusville, PA

The first oil rush in America started in Titusville, Pennsylvania, in the Oil Creek valley when Edwin Drake struck "rock oil" there in 1859. Titusville and other towns on the shores of Oil Creek expanded rapidly as oil wells and refineries shot up across the region. Oil quickly became one of the most valuable commodities in the United States, and railroads expanded into Western Pennsylvania to ship petroleum to the rest of the country.

Pennsylvania oil production peaked in 1891 and was later surpassed by western states such as Texas and California, but some oil industry remains in Pennsylvania.

== Pre-rush history ==
Before petroleum was used as a fuel, oil had many uses. In Pennsylvania, the Native American tribes had been using oil from seeps for several centuries. Early European explorers discovered evidence of troughs dug alongside the creek where Native American tribes had collected oil for use as ointment, insect repellant, skin coloring and in religious ceremonies. These oil seeps, which are areas where oil spontaneously escapes the earth in gas or liquid form, were common across northern Pennsylvania. As the frontier expanded into Western Pennsylvania during the 18th century, the region became known for the oil beneath its surface, and maps of the era displayed the label “Petroleum.” With few uses for crude oil, the label served primarily to deter farmers who found the black soil inhospitable to their crops. Later, other uses became known. Crude oil began to be used as an alternative to whale oil for lamps, and inventors and scientists began to test oil for other uses, including energy.

=== Experiments with oil ===
With petroleum seeps popping up across western Pennsylvania, it became difficult for other extractive industries, especially for salt water wells to extract salt. This business was popular in the area at the time, but with oil from the seeps spilling into the wells, it became much more difficult. In 1849, Samuel Kier began extracting oil from the saltwater wells on his property. Upon further examination, Kier recognized that the medicinal oil being prescribed to his wife was the same in chemistry as the oil found in his wells. Kier sold his oil as a remedy and grew wealthy. Other uses for Kier's oil were explored.

In the 1850s, Kier began to drill for crude oil rather than separating it from salt water. After extracting the oil from drilling, Kier joined up with John T. Kirkpatrick to build the first refinery. Kier and Kirkpatrick distilled oil that could be used for lighting. For years after, Kier improved the crude oil refining process to produce the clean and efficient lighting oil. He called his oil “carbon oil.” To accompany his refined oil, Kier invented an oil-burning lamp that burned his oil with little bad odor or smoke. This could have been profitable to Kier, but he never patented his lamp.

=== Pennsylvania Rock Oil Company ===
News of Kier's experiments spread, and George Bissell, a lawyer from New York, learned of Kier's success. In 1854, Bissell commissioned a study from Yale chemist Benjamin Silliman, Jr. to assess the viability of harvesting oil in western Pennsylvania. After Silliman's results confirmed that the petroleum in the Oil Creek valley could profitably be distilled into lamp oil, Bissell founded the Pennsylvania Rock Oil Company. The company was funded by businessmen and bankers from New Haven, Connecticut. Among the stockholders was banker James Townsend.

In 1857, Bissell and Townsend hired Edwin Drake to travel to Titusville and drill for crude oil. Drake was an unemployed railroad conductor whose sole qualification for this job seems to have been a free railroad pass that allowed travel to Titusville. Drake secured some land and reported back that he believed the land was oil rich and the oil industry could be extremely profitable. In 1858, the Pennsylvania Rock Oil Company became the Seneca Oil Company with Drake as president.

=== Drake strikes oil ===
Drake began drilling for oil in Titusville near Oil Creek, but at first met with little success. He used an old steam engine to drill. Many of his drilling sites only yielded trace amounts of oil. He and his assistant, blacksmith Billy Smith, endured fires, financial setbacks, and the ridicule of the local inhabitants. When the Seneca Oil Company gave up and decided to withdraw its funding, Drake obtained a personal line of credit to continue digging. On August 27, 1859, Drake struck oil at 69 feet (21 m) below ground, just before his funds ran out. This marked the beginning of drastic change for the people of Western Pennsylvania. His drilling is considered the "first large-scale commercial extraction of petroleum".

Drake's success would not last. He had not purchased much land in the region, and the oil industry exploded around him outside his control. His first well yielded only modest returns, and he was fired by Seneca. He never patented the drilling method he pioneered and lost his modest earnings from the oil business speculating on Wall Street. He died a poor pensioner in 1880.

== Oil rush ==
Soon the area had many wells drilled by Seneca Oil Company and others. The oil boom in Pennsylvania paralleled in many ways the gold rush in California ten years earlier. It is reported that in the first year (1859), these wells produced 4,500 barrels (720 m^{3}). Boomtowns such as Titusville, Oil City and Pithole sprang up within years, and an early chronicler of the region, Reverend S. J. M. Eaton, observed in 1866 that the Oil Creek valley was so densely packed it was impossible to distinguish the borders where one town ended and another began. The Titusville population exploded from 250 residents to over 10,000 in little more than five years, and in 1866 it incorporated as a city. Ironworks were erected to supply drilling tools, and eight oil refineries were built between 1862 and 1868. Pithole expanded from four log-cabin farmhouses to a bustling city with over 50 hotels over the span of five months in 1865.

Annual domestic output of crude swelled from 2,000 barrels (320 m^{3}) in 1859, the year of Drake's discovery, to 4,000,000 barrels (640,000 m^{3}) in 1869 and 10,000,000 barrels (1,600,000 m^{3}) in 1873. The ongoing industrial development of Europe spurred this rapid expansion. European, and especially British, factories began importing large quantities of cheap American oil during the 1860s. By 1866, US petroleum exports far surpassed petroleum distributed to domestic markets and the value of these exports nearly doubled from $16 million in 1865 to $30 million in 1869. Petroleum jumped from the sixth most valuable US export to the second most valuable during this period. At the peak of the oil boom, Pennsylvania wells were producing one third of the world's oil.

=== Transportation ===
In the first years of the oil rush, high overland shipping costs drove many well owners to float their product down Oil Creek to the Allegheny River as lumber producers did. For decades, logs had been transported using man-made floods, known as pond freshets, created by successively breaking milldams along the length of the river. These freshets could carry up to 800 skiffs filled with crude oil downstream at once. Most skiffs held between 700 and 800 barrels (110 and 130 m^{3}) of oil, but one third of that leaked out of the skiffs before they were even launched and another third was lost by the time the skiffs reached Pittsburgh. Only three in five of the flimsy vessels survived the trip without being destroyed by collisions with rocks, fallen trees, or other skiffs.

In 1862, the Oil Creek Railroad Company completed a line that connected Titusville to the Philadelphia and Erie Railroad and the Atlantic and Great Western Railroad in Corry, Pennsylvania. The railroad brought more people into the Oil Creek valley and provided a safer alternative to the freshets for transporting barrels of crude. The oil was carried from the wells to the railroad in horse-drawn wagons. In 1865, Laurence Myers of Philadelphia made an improvement on a patent from 1851 that was invented to transport coal at that time. The patent on July 18, 1865, was an improvement made for a freight car that would transport petroleum and crude oil. He named it the Rotary Oil Car. It was the first appearance of an oil tank on wheels. Three books mention his invention.

Pipelines were laid from the oil fields directly to the rail line, ending horse-drawn transport. The Farmers Railroad extended the rail line 20 km south from Petroleum Center, Pennsylvania, to Oil City. In February 1871, the Union City & Titusville Railroad (UC&T), which was built to compete with the Oil Creek Railroad, was completed. The UC&T became part of the larger Philadelphia and Erie Railroad in July 1871.

=== Consolidation and end of the boom ===
The rush to Pennsylvania created violent swings in the petroleum market for the first decade of the oil boom. In 1861, the proliferation of wells across the Oil Creek valley pushed the price of oil down from $10 per barrel to 10 cents per barrel. In response, producers in the region formed the Oil Creek Association to restrict output and maintain a minimum price of $4 per barrel. Despite efforts such as this to control the petroleum market, the volatile boom-bust cycle continued into the early 1870s. By 1871, refining capacity had grown to over 12 million barrels per year, more than twice the amount of oil that was actually processed in that year. The first oil exchange in the U.S. was established in Titusville in January 1872 in response to rumors that a conspiratorial ring of crude oil traders in New York City had cornered the market. As the decade progressed, larger producers such as John D. Rockefeller’s Standard Oil began to consolidate their holdings over the wells and refineries in the region, and the oil rush began to settle down.

Pennsylvania oil production peaked in 1891, when the state produced 31 million barrels of oil, 58% of the nation's oil that year. But 1892 was the last year that Pennsylvania wells provided a majority of the oil produced in the U.S., and in 1895, Ohio surpassed Pennsylvania as an oil producer. By 1907, the decline of the Pennsylvania fields and the great discoveries made in Texas, California, and Oklahoma, left Pennsylvania with less than 10% of the nation's oil production.

By 1901, the Pennsylvania oil boom was over. The formation of the Standard Oil Trust in 1882 effectively established a monopoly over the industry in Pennsylvania, and the discovery of oil in Texas, California and Wyoming shifted the nation's attention elsewhere. Pennsylvania continued to be a significant producer of petroleum for much of the 20th century.

== See also ==
- History of the petroleum industry in the United States
- North Dakota oil boom
