= George Bissell (industrialist) =

American oil industry pioneer (1821–1884)

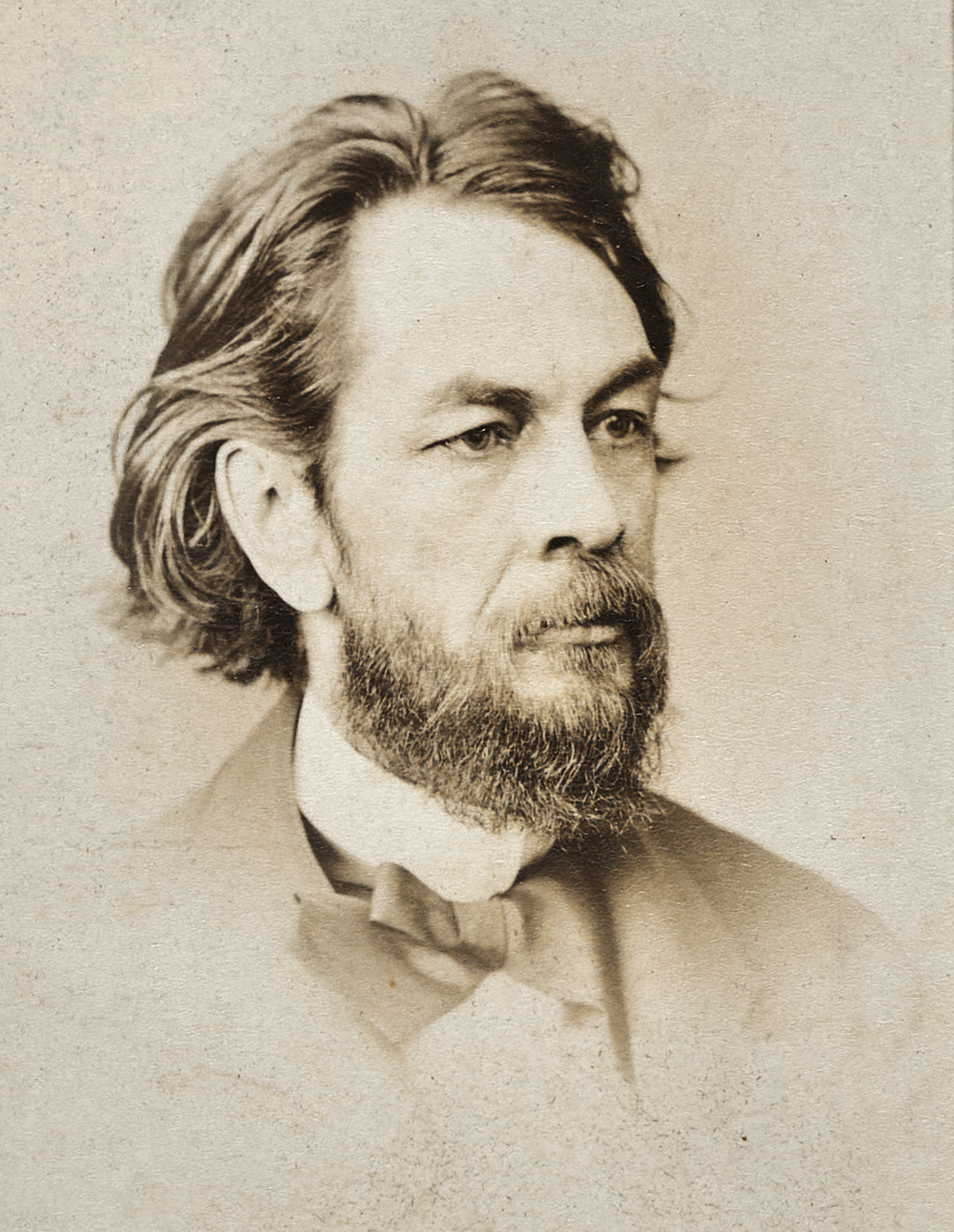
- Bissell in the 1860s
- Born: George Henry Bissell; November 8, 1821; Hanover, New Hampshire, U.S.
- Died: November 19, 1884 (aged 63); New York City, U.S.
- Resting place: Dartmouth College Cemetery (Hanover, New Hampshire)
- Known for: American oil industry pioneer

George Henry Bissell (November 8, 1821 – November 19, 1884) was an entrepreneur and industrialist who is often considered the father of the American oil industry. His company, the Pennsylvania Rock Oil, was the first Petroleum company in America. His businesses included oil companies, banks, railroads, and substantial real estate in New York. At his death in 1884, his son Pelham would inherit his fortune, making him among the richest men in the United States.

== Early life and education ==
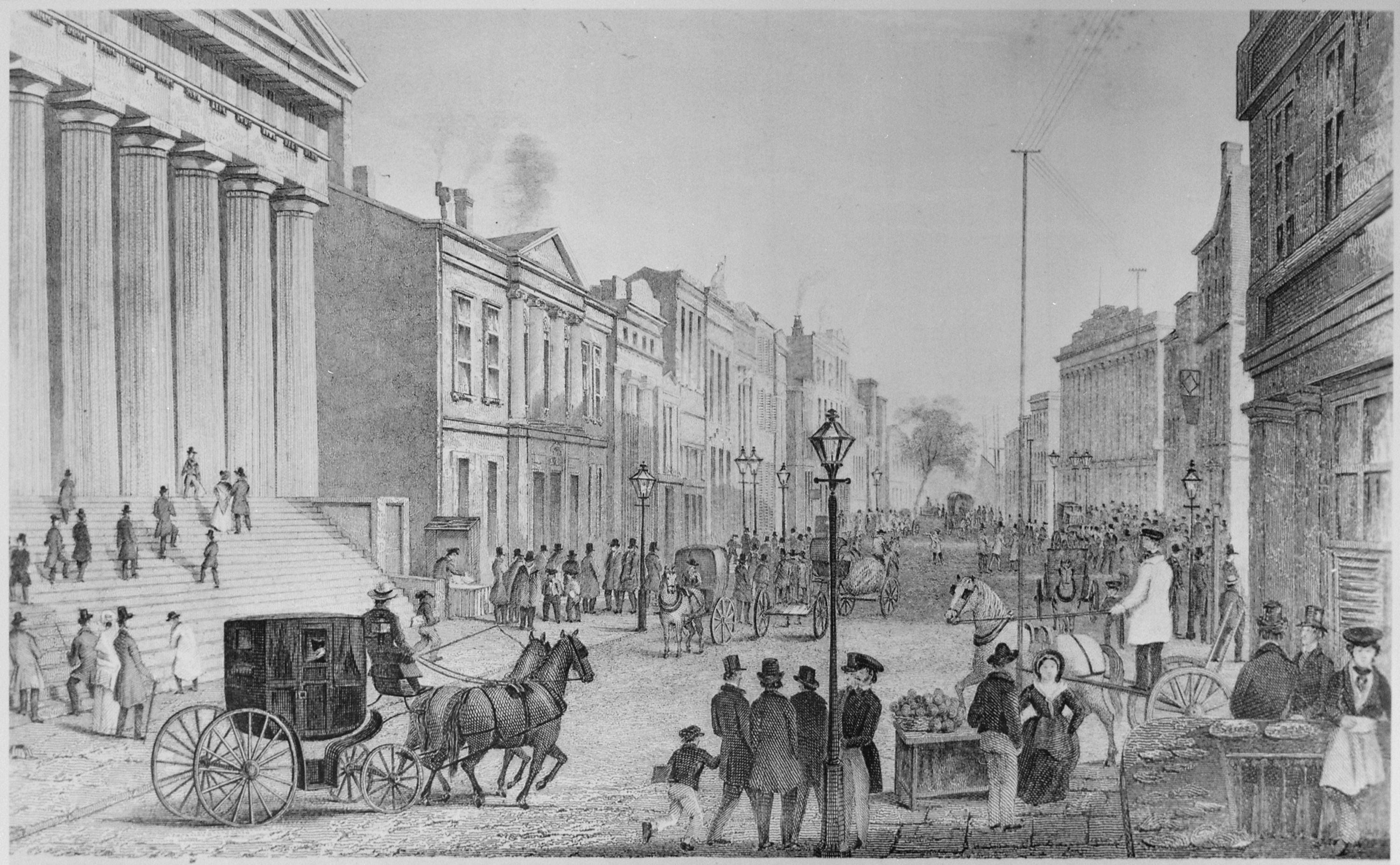
An 1883 illustration of Wall Street in Lower Manhattan

Bissell was born in Hanover, New Hampshire, the son of Nancy (Wemple) and Isaac Bissell, and grandson of Isaac Bissell. His father was a fur trader in Detroit and a Revolutionary war soldier, while his mother was a daughter of John Wemple, a Revolutionary war Captain. He was a descendant of a noble French huguenots family, and had as relatives Yale University graduate Clark Bissell, Connecticut Governor and Senator, and Col. William Henry Bissell, Illinois Governor and Congressman. George Bissell's father died when he was twelve years old.

Bissell attended Dartmouth College, paying his way by teaching and writing newspaper articles. He graduated in 1845 having studied literature and languages.

== Career ==
Bissell then continued to earn a living as a teacher at Norwich Academy and also traveled, working as a journalist. He settled for a time in New Orleans, where he served as a high school principal and superintendent of schools. He continued to study languages and also took up the study of law in his spare time. In 1853, Bissell relocated to New York City to become a practicing attorney. Concern over the yellow fever epidemic in New Orleans was a reason for Bissell's relocation.

In 1853, during a social visit to Dr. Dixi Crosby, a professor at Dartmouth College in Hanover, New Hampshire, Bissell saw samples of what was then known as "rock oil," which had been obtained from the ground. Bissell was aware of the primitive oil-gathering industry in western Pennsylvania. At the time, oil was gathered by such crude methods as soaking blankets in surface oil and then draining the blankets over barrels. Rock oil in that period of time was used mainly for medicinal purposes. Bissell recognized that the oil could be refined to produce kerosene, then in high demand, especially for lighting. If the rock oil could be obtained inexpensively and properly refined, it could replace such substances as whale oil and coal oil as sources of fuel for illumination.

Recognizing the potential for rock oil in 1854, Bissell and his law partner Jonathan Eveleth, a Harvard graduate, decided to start their own firm. Eveleth & Bissell will be formed and their office would be in New York at 14 Wall Street, on Wall Street. Together, they purchased a 105-acre farm, the Hibbard Farm which was owned by timber company Brewer, Watson & Co, at a cost of $5000. The timber company had also received a competitive offer from Samuel Kier, a pioneer in oil refining, and an early founder of Jones and Laughlin Steel Company, an important competitor of Andrew Carnegie.

Despite having received a lucrative offer from Kier, Brewer, Watson & Co decided to accept the one of Bissell and Eveleth, as they intended to sell the stock of their new enterprise through New York's financial regulated markets, and Brewer, Watson & Co. perceived that they could therefore develop an equity position in the new business. In December 1854, Bissell and Eveleth formed the Pennsylvania Rock Oil Company while transferring ownership of the Hibbard Farm to the new company. The Pennsylvania Rock Oil Co. was the first oil exploration company in the United States. Early in the enterprise, Bissell and Eveleth gained the support of James Townsend, a bank President from New Haven, Connecticut, who helped them obtain further support.

Shortly after obtaining the Hibbard Farm, Bissell and Eveleth hired Yale University chemist Benjamin Silliman Jr. and coal oil chemist Luther Atwood of Boston to evaluate the suitability of the rock oil for making a refined oil suitable for illumination. The evaluation included an economic study and a chemical analysis, and Atwood was positive on the prospects from the beginning of the evaluation. Silliman was more cautious, although he issued a promising opinion in May 1855. Silliman's evaluation cost Bissell and Eveleth $1200. With these expert opinions, Bissell and Eveleth continued with their endeavor.

=== Seneca Oil Company ===
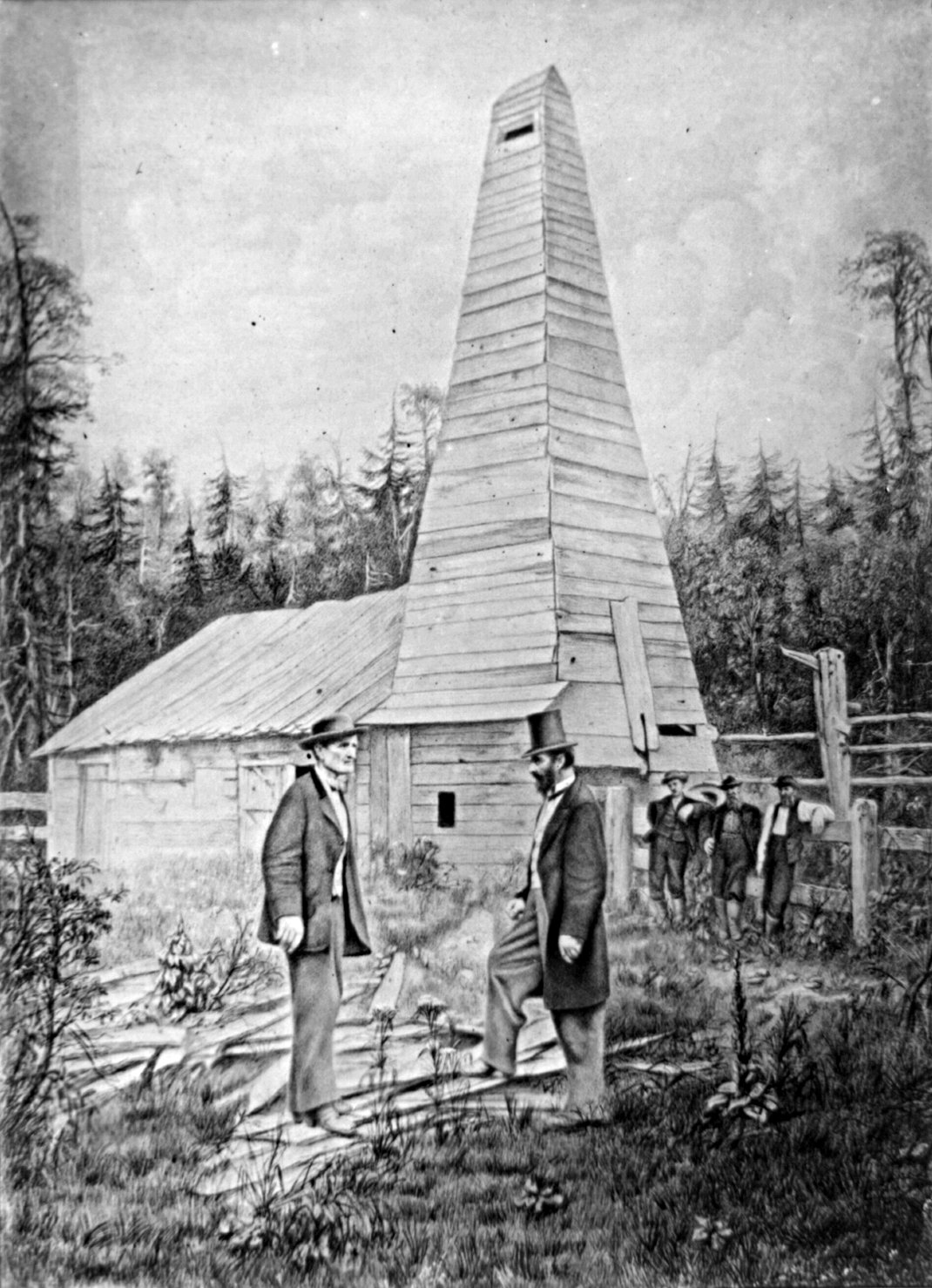
The first oil well, developed by Bissell and Edwin Drake in Titusville, Pennsylvania

In 1856, after seeing pictures of derrick drilling for salt, Bissell conceived of the idea of drilling for oil, rather than mining it or digging for it as is done with salt wells. This was widely considered ludicrous at the time. However, Bissell and Eveleth pursued the idea and sought investors. This included a group from New Haven, Connecticut, who eventually formed the Seneca Oil Company. Bissell and Eveleth had a royalty dispute with the investors in Seneca Oil Co., although a business relationship resulted.

On August 27, 1859, the company first succeeded in striking oil, on a farm in Titusville, Pennsylvania. John D. Rockefeller took notice of this event and decided to jump on the opportunity and joined the Pennsylvania oil rush, forming his own oil-refining business with Maurice B. Clark, naming it Clark & Rockefeller. Rockefeller's enterprise would evolve into the Rockefeller, Andrews & Flagler partnership, with Samuel Andrews, Henry Flagler, and Stephen V. Harkness as associates.

As a result of the first success at striking oil, a business relationship will develop between Bissell's Pennsylvania Rock Oil Co. and Seneca Oil Company. Colonel Edwin Drake became involved in the enterprise through his employment with Seneca Oil Co., and Drake played a critical role in the first successful oil well in the region. Bissell, through Pennsylvania Rock Oil Co., invested heavily in the surrounding region with significant financial success. With time, Seneca Oil Co. became unable to pay the royalties due to the Pennsylvania Rock Oil Company.

The matter was resolved when Bissell and Eveleth agreed to forgive the unpaid royalties in exchange for taking full title to the portion of the Hibbard Farm that Seneca Oil controlled. Additionally, Eveleth died in 1862. As a result of these two events, Bissell had much control over development of this oil-producing region. He continued to attract investors, to develop new oil fields in the region, and built a railroad to carry the oil to markets. In an 1866 economic downturn, Bissell opened a bank in the region, George H. Bissell & Co., to assure continued development of the oil-producing region. His bank at Petroleum Center, Pennsylvania, with office at 5 Beekman Street, New York, was regarded as one of the most substantial banking institution in the oil industry at the time.

=== Investments ===
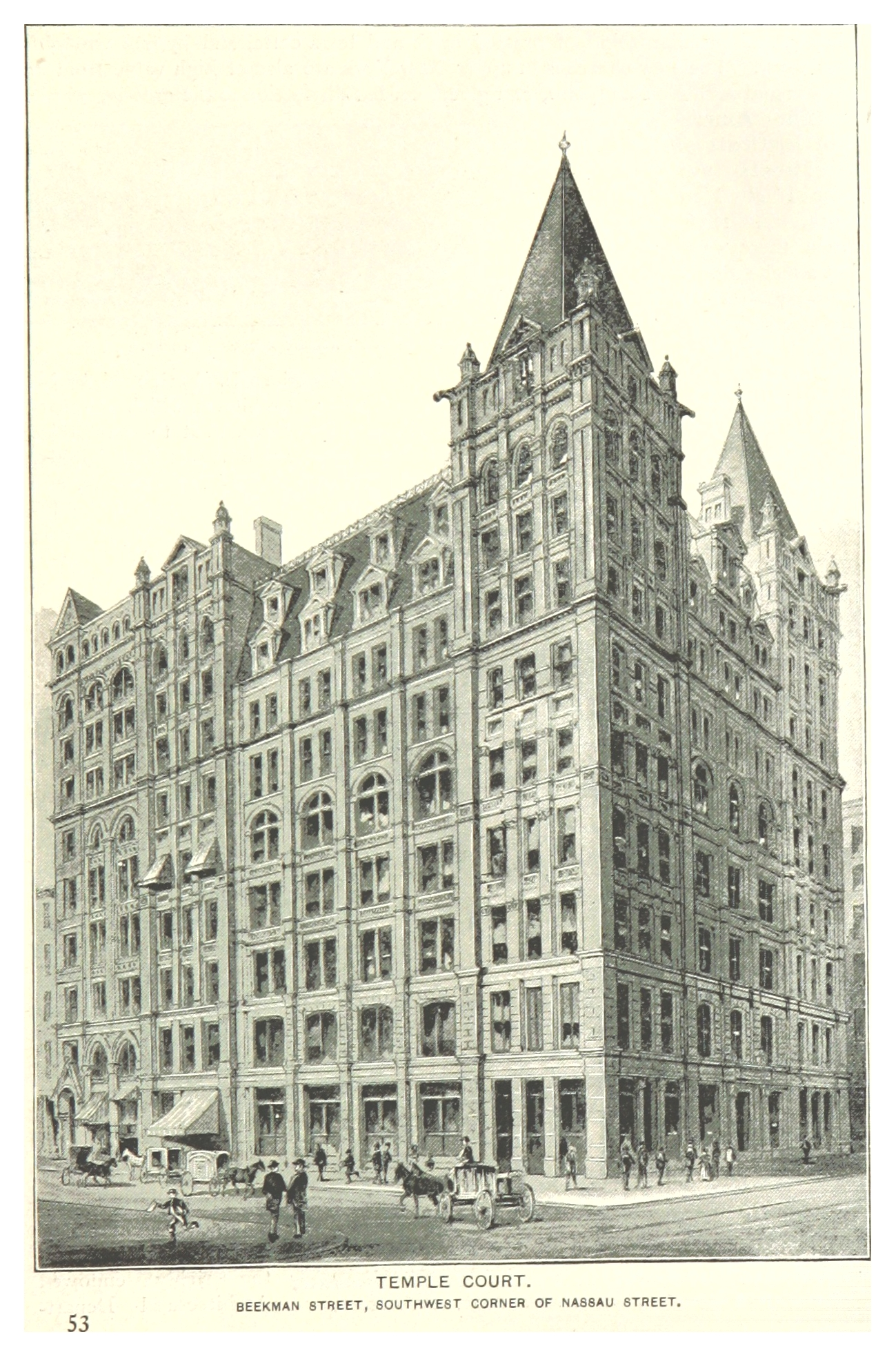
5 Beekman Street, Manhattan

When Bissell's oil enterprise began to flourish, he moved from New York City to the Pennsylvania Oil Region, taking up residence at the Franklin Hotel in Franklin, Pennsylvania. He lived in Pennsylvania until 1864, when he returned to New York City. On his return, Bissell diversified his investments and started to include insurance in his portfolio. In addition to the Hibbard Farm and his bank, Bissell's other investments in the region included various other farms and oil wells, a barrel factory, the Central Petroleum Company, the Farmer's Railroad, United Petroleum Farms Company, and the George H. Bissell Express Company.

When retiring in New York, he was the owner of 3 banks, a railroad, and was also director and President of various companies, such as the Peruvian Petroleum Company and the Peruvian Refining Company. He and other investors started these companies with a capital of 5 millions dollars and a lease on 4.5 millions acres of land. They supplied most of the oil in west South America, exporting the surplus to Australia, England and New Zealand.

He also invested extensively in real estate, becoming one of the largest operators in dealing in New York real estate, which would be inherited by his son Pelham, along with his oil companies, banks and railroads. His son became a millionaire as a result, as seen in the registry of the American Millionaires of 1892, with a fortune of over a million dollars, which translate to over a billion dollars in 2022 money. There was only 4047 millionaires in the United States at the time, making him among the richest men in the country.

== Legacy ==
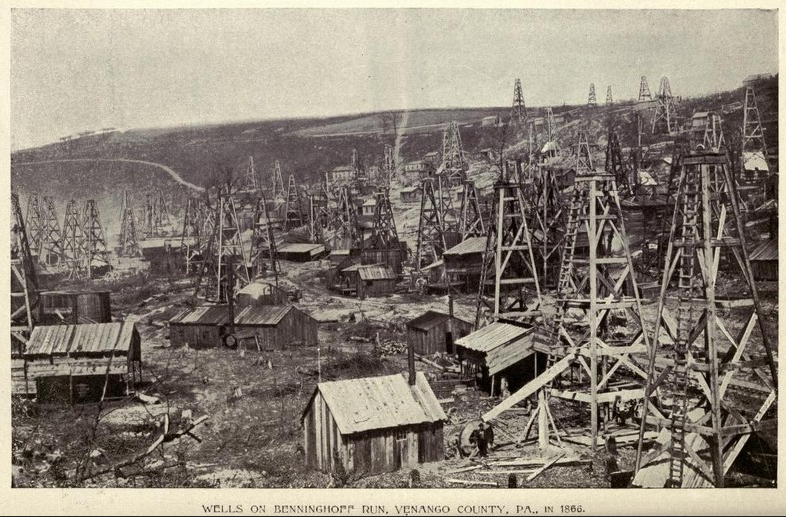
Oil Rush in Venango County, Pennsylvania, in 1866

As the decade progressed, large producers like John D. Rockefeller would learn at his expense, and would begin to consolidate the oil wells and refineries in Pennsylvania. By 1882, with the formation of the Standard Oil Trust, Rockefeller would effectively establish a monopoly over the industry in the region, and with the discovery of oil in other states, the nation's interest would shift elsewhere.

Other competitors also emerged in the oil industry, such as the Nobel family through Branobel, later known for their Nobel Prize award, and the French branch of the Rothschild family, through the Caspian and Black Sea Oil Company led by Alphonse de Rothschild.

George H. Bissell's name would be seen as a household word among oil men during his lifetime, and from all over the continent. In the oil industry, he was a giant, and his business empire was seen as an industry of its own.

Bissell funded the Bissell Hall which was a gymnasium on the campus of Dartmouth University that included a gymnastics center, a bowling alley, and an indoor track. This building was demolished in 1958. A residence hall constructed that year, Bissell Hall of the Choates, is now named in his honor.

The Pennsylvania Rock Oil Co.'s agent, Edwin Drake, is sometimes credited with the "discovery" of oil, although the success of Drake's efforts is due in part to Bissell's business acumen.

Bissell and his enterprises are also featured in the Pulitzer award book The Prize: The Epic Quest for Oil, Money, and Power.

== Personal life ==
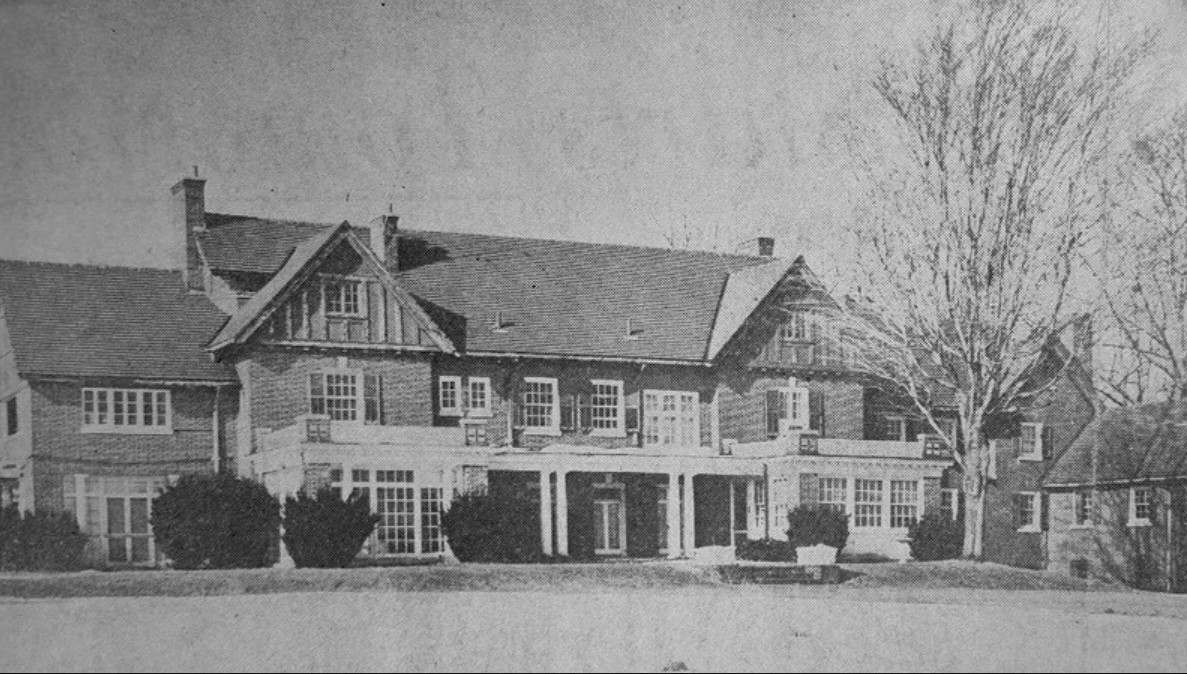
Cedar Hill Estate, 1968, property of Mary Valentine Yale's brother, Eugene Jr., was sold to the Astors

Bissell's wife was Ophie Louise Griffin, with whom he had two children. Ophie died in 1867. At the time of Bissell's death in 1884, he was living at 16 West 40th Street in New York City. He was interred at the Dartmouth College Cemetery.

His son, Pelham St. George Bissell, a millionaire of 1892, married to Helen Alsop French, daughter of Colonel Thomas J. French. He was educated at Columbia College, and was a large owner of the Adirondacks Pulp Company, later merged into the International Paper Company. He was also a member of the Columbia Alumni Association, the New York Athletic Club and the New York Historical Society.

His grandson, Pelham St. George Bissell Jr., married to Mary Valentine Yale Bissell (1889-1948), a member of the Yale family and his third cousin. Her mother, Mary Valentine Yale (1870-1916), niece of Dr. Leroy Milton Yale Jr., was the wife of Eugene Van Name Bissell, and sister-in-law of shipping magnate Edgar F. Luckenbach, whose niece was daughter of Charles Yost, United Nations Ambassador under President Nixon. Her brother, Eugene Bissell Jr., was the proprietor of the Cedar Hill Estate in 1946, originally owned by George Ludlow Lee Sr., and was sold in 1950 to John Jacob Astor VI of the Astor family, and became known as the Astor Estate. Astor lived at the Astor Mansion on Fifth Avenue and was the grandson of Mrs. Astor of Beechwood.

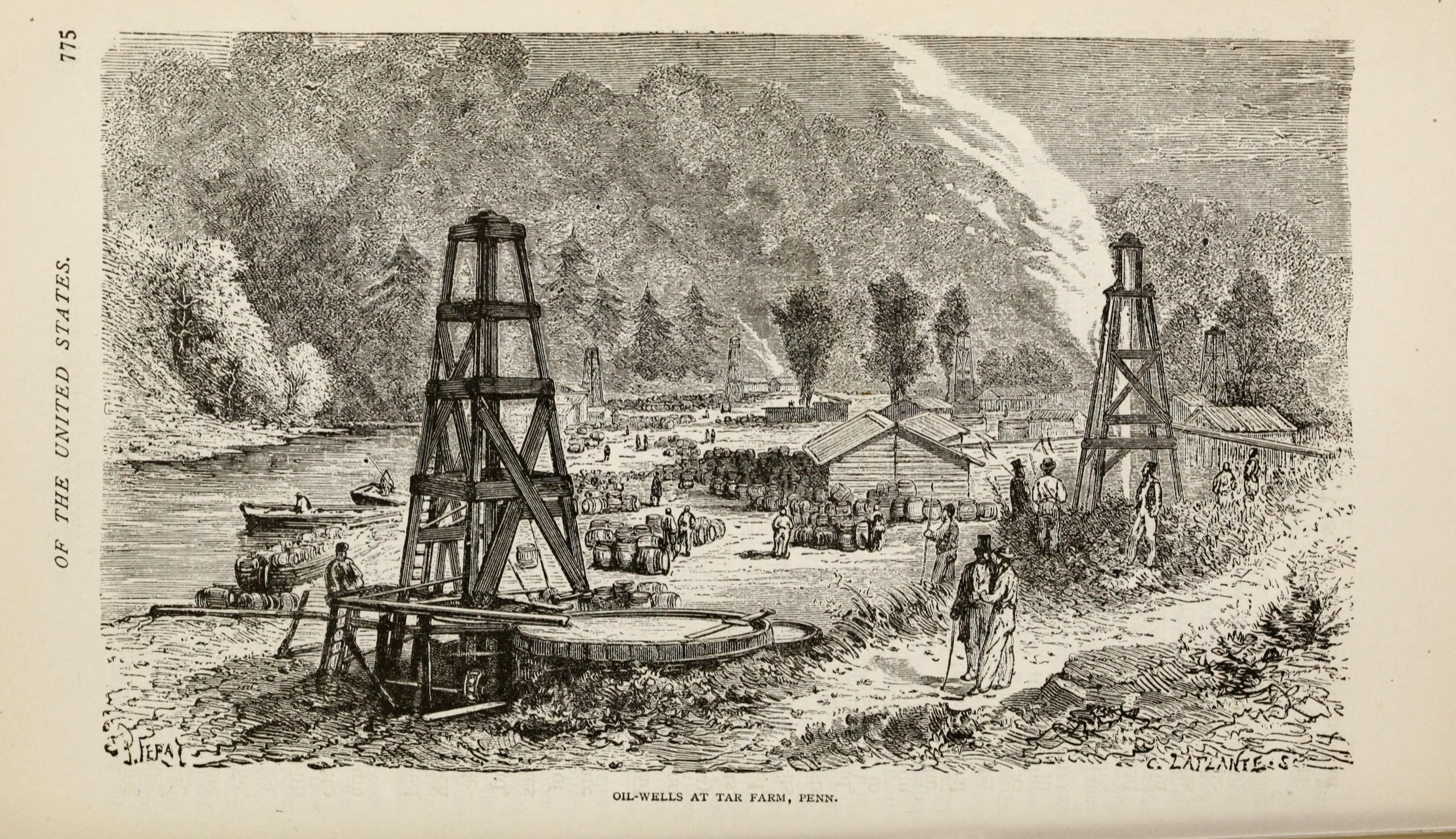
Oil wells, drilling oil at Tar Farms, Pennsylvania, 1878

The Bissell couple resided on Park Avenue, New York. Pelham Jr. served as a special attorney for the U.S. Department of Justice, and as Judge and President Justice of the Municipal Court of the City of New York. He also served as Chairman of the Mayor's Board of Survey, joined the Union League Club of New York, and served in the army as Lieutenant, Captain, Major and Lieutenant-Colonel.

Mary Valentine Yale served as Chairman of American Legion Auxiliary in New York, Chairman of the First New York District of the Auxiliary, President of the Greenwich Village unit, and Salon 33, Society of 8 and 40. She was also member of the Daughters of the American Revolution and of the Society of Mayflower Descendants. One of their children, Pelham St. George Bissell III, was Lieutenant-Colonel during World War II, Judge of Manhattan's Civil Court for 30 years, and a graduate from Columbia University. A daughter, Ophelia Molla Bissell, married Brigadier General William Wilbur.

== See also ==
- Pennsylvania oil rush
- Drake Well Museum
