= History of the petroleum industry in the United States =

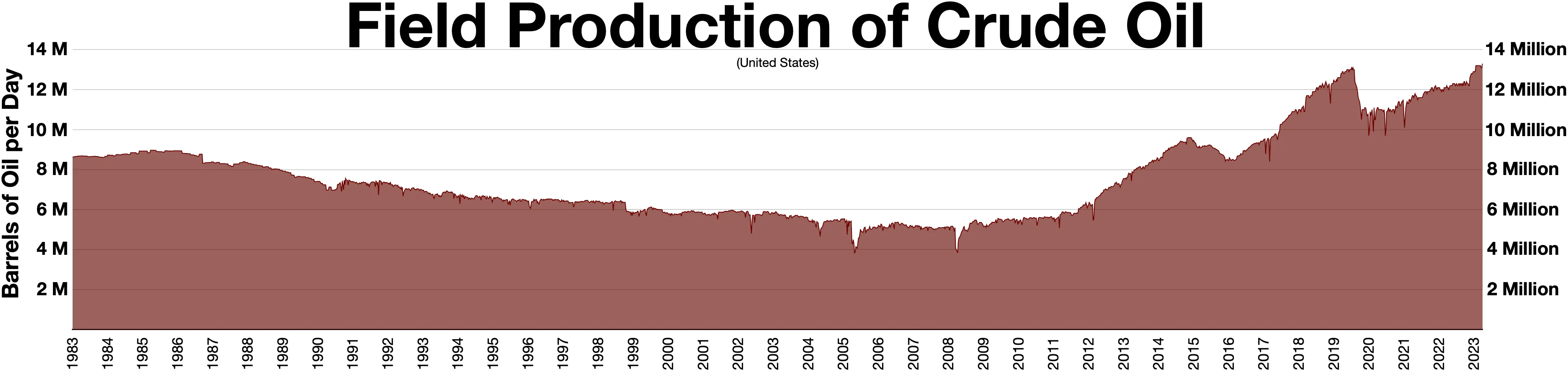
Crude oil production

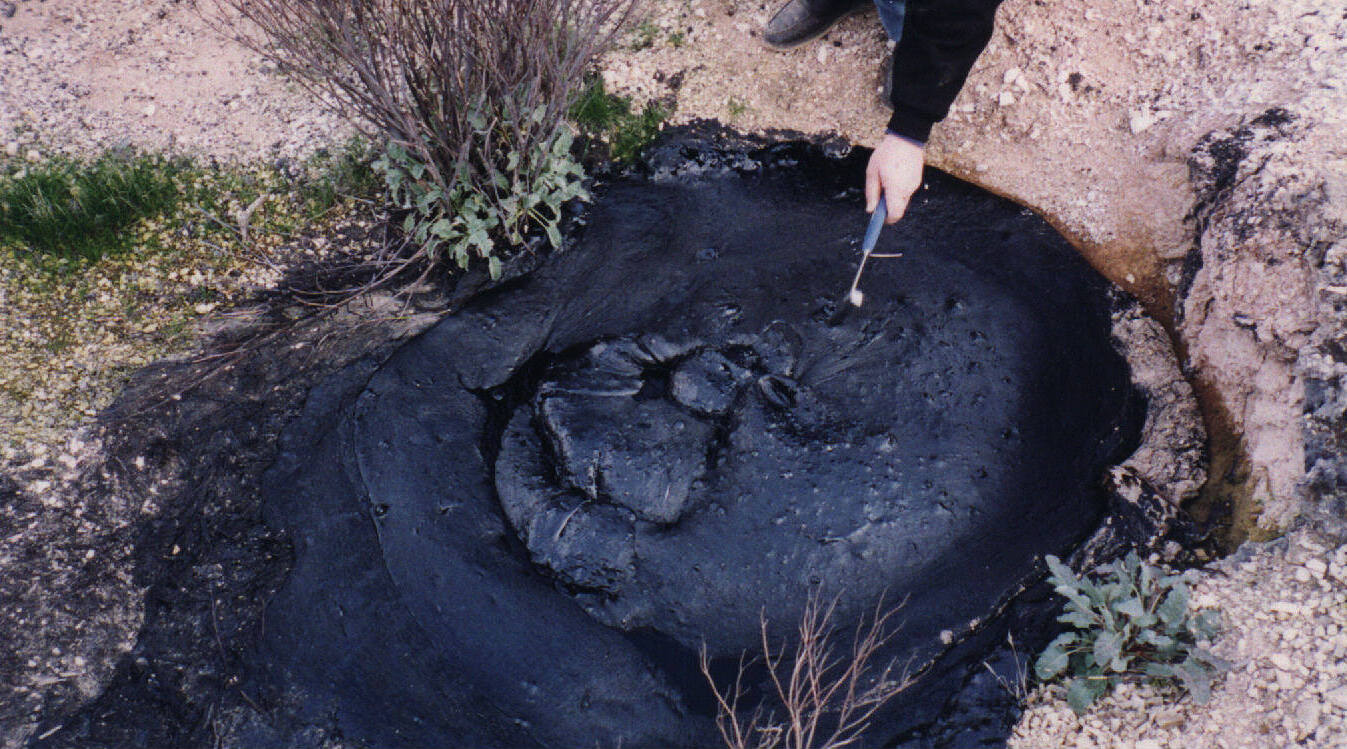
Natural oil seeps such as this in the McKittrick area of California were used by the Native Americans and later mined by settlers.

The history of the petroleum industry in the United States goes back to the early 19th century, although the indigenous peoples, like many ancient societies, have used petroleum seeps since prehistoric times; where found, these seeps signaled the growth of the industry from the earliest discoveries to the more recent.

Petroleum became a major industry following the oil discovery at Oil Creek, Pennsylvania, in 1859. For much of the 19th and 20th centuries, the US was the largest oil producing country in the world. US regained the position of the largest oil producing country in the world in 2018 and has kept it every year since as of 2022.

== Pre-Industrial Era ==
Native Americans had known of the oil in western Pennsylvania, and had made some use of it for many years before the mid-19th century. Early European explorers noted seeps of oil and natural gas in western Pennsylvania and New York. The earliest written record of the use of oil was by the Franciscan missionary Joseph de La Roche Daillon in 1627. Daillon encountered the Native American group called the Wenrohronon at the site of Oil Springs. Daillon noted the tribe's use of crude petroleum (then a largely unknown substance) as an alleged medicine. Their use of petroleum was remarkable enough that they were named for it: the word "Wenrohronon" refers to living near a "place of floating film."

Later French missionaries noted other uses of petroleum. The Jesuit Relations of 1657 states:

As one approaches nearer to the country of the Cats, one finds heavy and thick water, which ignites like brandy, and boils up in bubbles of flame when fire is applied to it. It is, moreover, so oily, that all our Savages use it to anoint and grease their heads and their bodies.

== 19th Century ==
=== Before the Drake Well ===
Interest in oil grew substantially in the mid-1850s as scientists reported on the potential to manufacture kerosene from crude oil, if a sufficiently large oil supply could be found.

Salt was a valuable commodity, and an industry developed near salt springs in the Ohio River Valley, producing salt by evaporating brine from the springs. Salt wells were sunk at the salt springs to increase the supply of brine for evaporation. Some of the wells were hand-dug, but salt producers also learned to drill wells by percussion (cable tool) methods. In a number of locations in western Virginia, Ohio, and Kentucky, oil and natural gas came up the wells along with the brine. The oil was mostly a nuisance, but some salt producers saved it and sold it as illuminating oil or medicine. In some locations, enough natural gas was produced to be used as fuel for the salt evaporating pans. Early salt brine wells that produced byproduct oil included the Thorla-McKee Well of Ohio in 1814, a well near Burkesville, Kentucky, in 1828, and wells at Burning Springs, West Virginia, by 1836.

The US natural gas industry started in 1821 at Fredonia, Chautauqua County, New York, when William Hart dug a well to a depth of 27 feet (8.2 m) into gas-bearing shale, then drilled a borehole 43 feet (13 m) further, and piped the natural gas to a nearby inn where it was burned for illumination. Soon many gas wells were drilled in the area, and the gas-lit streets of Fredonia became a tourist attraction.

=== Drake well, Titusville, Pennsylvania ===
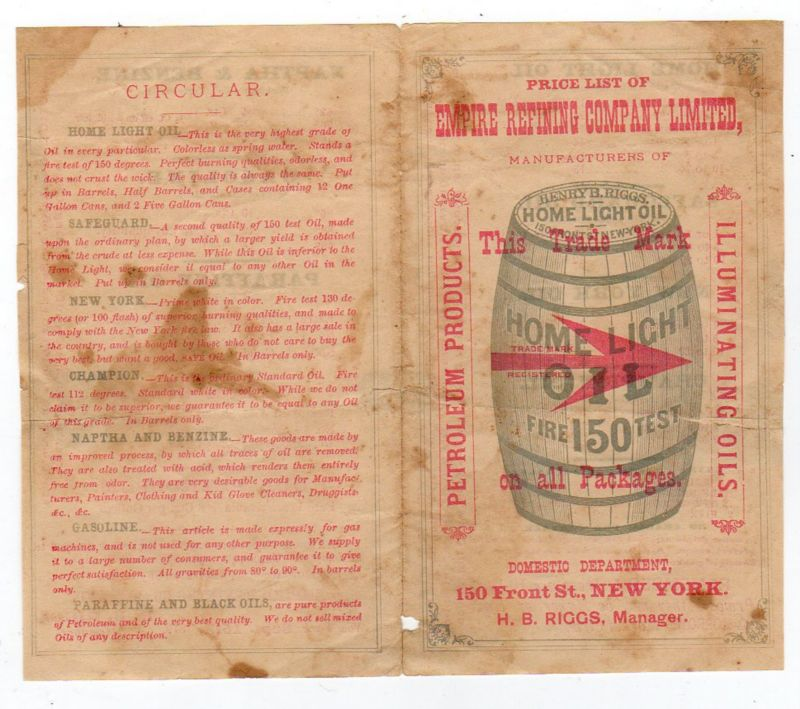
1879 retail brochure for various petroleum products

On August 27, 1859, George Bissell and Edwin L. Drake made the first successful use of a drilling rig on a well drilled especially to produce oil, at a site on Oil Creek near Titusville, Pennsylvania. The Drake partners were encouraged by Benjamin Silliman (1779–1864), a chemistry professor at Yale, who tested a sample of the oil, and assured them that it could be distilled into useful products such as kerosene for lamps.

The Drake well is often referred to as the first "commercial oil well." Before the Drake well, oil-producing wells in the United States were wells that were drilled for salt brine, and produced oil and gas only as accidental byproducts. Historians have noted that the importance of the Drake well was not in being the first well to produce oil, but in attracting the first great wave of investment in oil drilling, refining, and marketing:

"The importance of the Drake well was in the fact that it caused prompt additional drilling, thus establishing a supply of petroleum in sufficient quantity to support business enterprises of magnitude.

=== Appalachian Basin ===
The success of the Drake well quickly led to oil drilling in other locations in the western Appalachian Mountains, where oil was seeping to the surface, or where salt drillers had previously found oil fouling their salt wells. During the American Civil War, the oil-producing region spread over much of western Pennsylvania, up into western New York state, and down the Ohio River valley into the states of Ohio, Kentucky, and the western part of Virginia (now West Virginia). The Appalachian Basin continued to be the leading oil-producing region in the United States through 1904.

The first commercial oil well in New York was drilled in 1865. New York's (and Northwestern Pennsylvania) crude oil is very high in paraffin.

The principal product of the oil in the 19th century was kerosene, which quickly replaced whale oil for illuminating purposes in the United States. Originally dealing in whale oil which was widely used for illumination, Charles Pratt (1830–1891) of Massachusetts was an early pioneer of the natural oil industry in the United States. He was founder of Astral Oil Works in the Greenpoint section of Brooklyn, New York. Pratt's product later gave rise to the slogan, "The holy lamps of Tibet are primed with Astral Oil." He joined with his protégé Henry H. Rogers to form Charles Pratt and Company in 1867. Both companies became part of John D. Rockefeller's Standard Oil in 1874.

=== Mid-Continent ===
The Mid-continent area is an area generally including Kansas, Oklahoma, Arkansas, North Louisiana and the part of Texas away from the Gulf Coast. The first commercially successful oil well drilled in Kansas was the Norman No. 1 near Neodesha, Kansas, on November 28, 1892.

- Corsicana, Texas, 1894, Texas, plus 44,000,000 barrels (7,000,000 m^{3})
- McCamey, 1928, Baker No. 1., Texas.

==== Oklahoma ====
Oil was discovered at Bartlesville and Burbank in 1897. But the initial discoveries created no great excitement until the discovery gusher of the Glenn Pool in 1905. The Glenn discovery came when Gulf Coast production was declining rapidly, and the operators were eager for new areas to drill. The increased drilling resulted in major discoveries at Cushing in 1912 and Healdton in 1913.

- Greater Seminole, 1926, Oklahoma, plus 200,000,000 barrels (32,000,000 m^{3})
- Oklahoma City, No. 1 Discovery Well, 1928, Oklahoma. The Mary Sudik No. 1, "Wild Mary Sudik", gusher did not blow until March 25, 1930—she sprayed an estimated 3,000 barrels (480 m^{3}) an hour (133 L/s) for the next 14 days.

==== East Texas ====
The largest oil field in the lower 48 states, the East Texas oil field, was not discovered until 1930, when wildcatter Columbus Marion Joiner (more commonly known as "Dad" Joiner) drilled the Daisy Bradford No. 3 well, in Rusk County, Texas.

==== North Louisiana ====
In 1906, the Caddo-Pine Island Field in northern Caddo Parish, Louisiana was discovered, and a rush of leasing and drilling activity ensued. In 1908, the first natural gas pipeline was constructed to transport gas from Caddo-Pine Island to Shreveport, Louisiana. This was one of the earliest commercial uses of natural gas, which was commonly viewed as an undesirable by-product of oil production and often "flared" or burnt off at the well site.

Other innovations in the Caddo-Pine Island Field included the first over-water oil platform, which was constructed in the field on Caddo Lake in 1910. In that same year, a major oil pipeline was constructed from Caddo-Pine Island Field to a refinery built and operated by Standard Oil Company of Louisiana in Baton Rouge, Louisiana. The refinery continues to operate today.

Other early petroleum discoveries in North Louisiana included the Bull Bayou Field, Red River Parish, Louisiana (1913), Monroe Gas Field, Ouachita Parish, Louisiana (1916), Homer Field, Claiborne Parish, Louisiana (1919) and Haynesville Field, Claiborne Parish, Louisiana (1921).

=== California ===
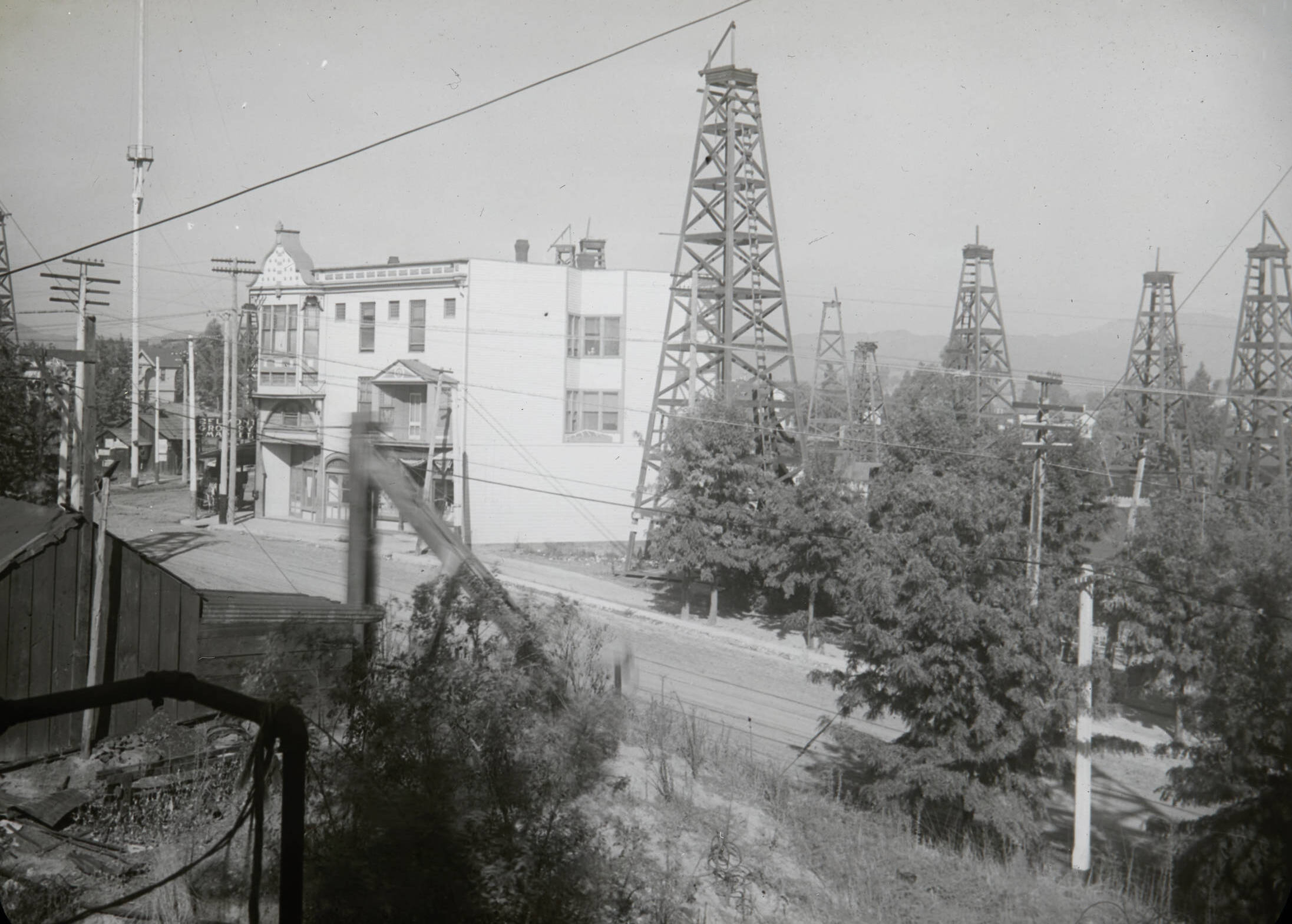
Los Angeles City oil field, 1905

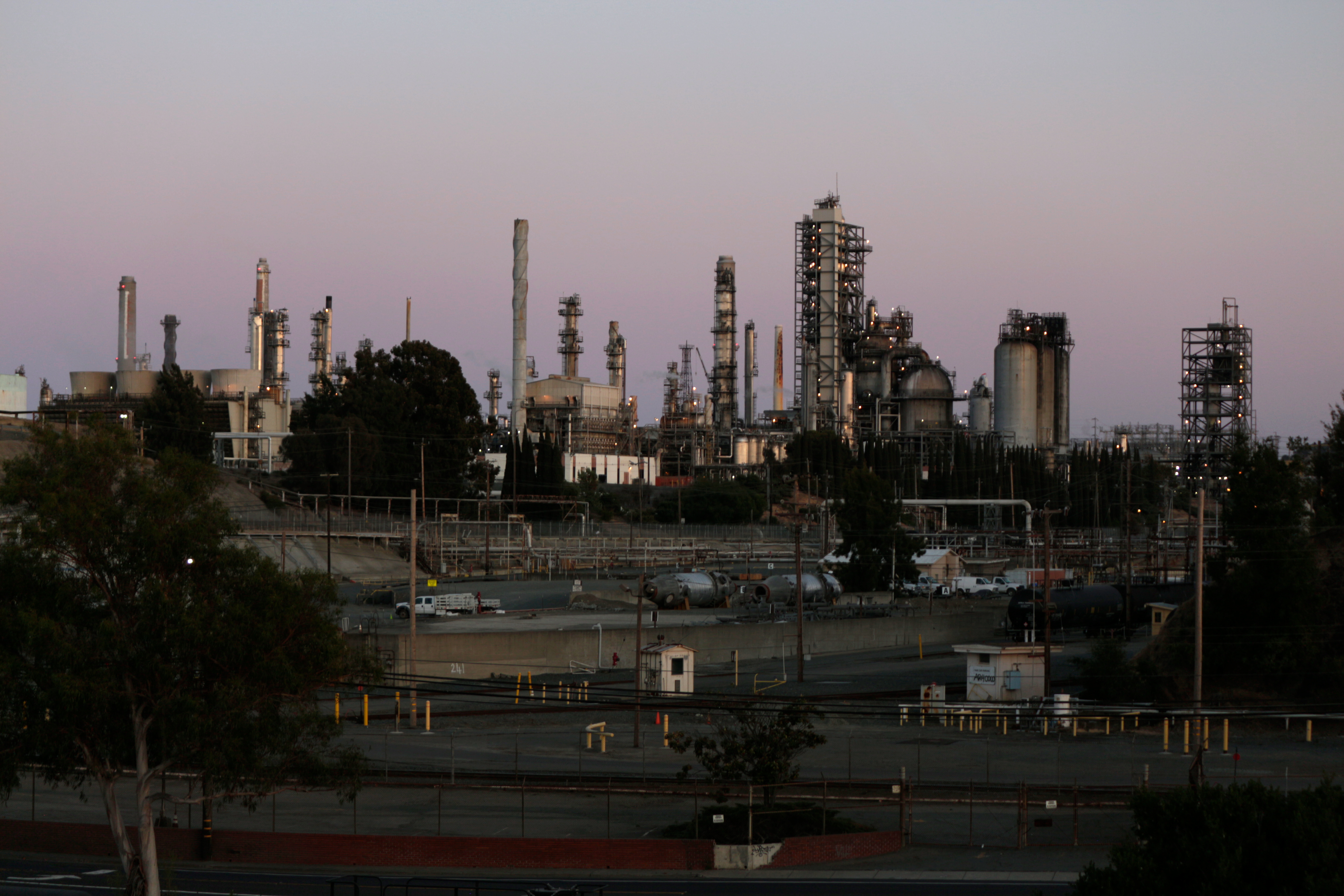
The Martinez Refining Company (Originally Shell), in Martinez, California, has operated continuously since its construction in 1915.

Native Americans had known of the tar seeps in southern California for thousands of years, and used the tar to waterproof their canoes. Spanish settlers also knew of the seeps, such as at Rancho La Brea (Spanish for Tar Ranch) in present-day Los Angeles, from which the priests obtained tar to waterproof the roofs of the Los Angeles and San Gabriel missions.

Despite the abundance of well-known seeps in southern California, the first commercial oil well in California was drilled in Humboldt County, northern California in 1865.

Some attempts were made in the 1860s to exploit oil deposits under tar seeps in the Ventura Basin of Ventura County and northeastern Los Angeles County. The early efforts failed because of complex geology, and, more importantly, because the refining techniques then available could not manufacture high-quality kerosene from California crude oil, which differed chemically from Pennsylvania crude oil. Most California crude oil in the early years was turned into the less lucrative products of fuel oil and asphalt.

Oil production in the Los Angeles Basin started with the discovery of the Brea-Olinda Oil Field in 1880, and continued with the development of the Los Angeles City Oil Field in 1893, the Beverly Hills Oil Field in 1900, the Salt Lake Oil Field in 1902, and many others. The discovery of the Long Beach Oil Field in 1921, which proved to be the world's richest in production per-acre of the time, increased the importance of the Los Angeles Basin as a worldwide oil producer. This increased again with the discovery of the Wilmington Oil Field in 1932, and the development of the Port of Los Angeles as a means of shipping crude oil overseas.

Production in Santa Barbara County began in the 1890s with the development of the Summerland Oil Field, which included the world's first offshore oil wells. With the discovery of the Orcutt and Lompoc fields, northern Santa Barbara County became a regional center of production; towns such as Orcutt owe their existence to the quickly growing industry.

Oil in the San Joaquin Basin was first discovered at the Coalinga field in 1890. By 1901, the San Joaquin Basin was the main oil-producing region of California, and it remains so in the 21st century, with huge oil fields including the Midway-Sunset, Kern River, and Belridge fields producing much of California's onshore oil.

=== Rocky Mountains ===
The first commercial oil well in the Rocky Mountains was drilled near Cañon City, Colorado in 1862. The wells in the Cañon City-Florence field, drilled near surface oil seeps, produced from fractures in the Pierre Shale.

- Bighorn Basin
- Denver Basin
- Green River Basin
- North Park (Colorado basin)
- Paradox Basin
- Piceance Basin
- Powder River Basin
- Raton Basin
- San Juan Basin
- Uinta Basin

=== Alaska ===
A Russian sea captain noted oil seeps along the shore of the Cook Inlet as early as 1853, and oil drilling began in 1898 in a number of locations along the southern coast of Alaska. Production was relatively small, however, until huge discoveries were made on Alaska's remote North Slope.

Petroleum seeps on the North Slope have been known for many years, and in 1923, the federal government created US Naval Petroleum Reserve No. 4 to cover the presumed oil fields beneath the seeps. Some exploration drilling was done in the reserve during World War II and the 1950s, but the remote location deterred intensive exploration until the 1960s. The Prudhoe Bay Oil Field, the largest oil field in the United States in terms of total oil produced, was discovered in 1968. Production began in 1977, following completion of the Trans-Alaska Pipeline. Through 2005, the field has produced 13 billion barrels (2.1×10^{9} m^{3}) of oil (an average of 1.5 million barrels/day), and is estimated to contain another 2 billion barrels (320×10^{6} m^{3}) of economically recoverable oil.

=== Brooklyn, New York ===
In the late 1800s, a number of oil refineries were concentrated in the Greenpoint area of Brooklyn, beginning with Astral Oil Works in 1867. In the 1970s, the Greenpoint oil spill was discovered, one of the largest spills in the history of the United States.

== 20th century ==
=== Gulf Coast ===
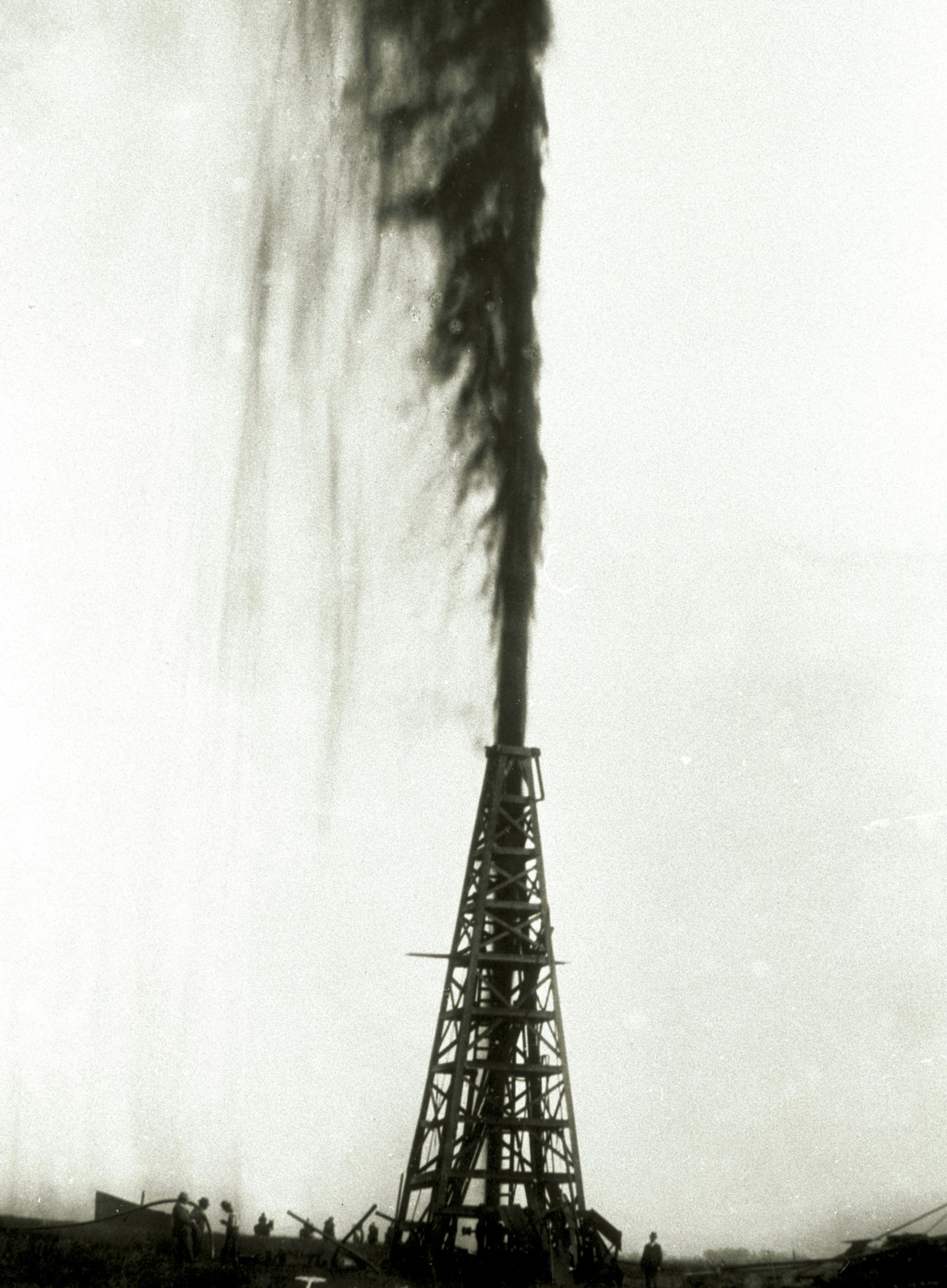
The Lucas gusher at Spindletop

Capt. Anthony Francis Lucas, an experienced mining engineer and salt driller, drilled a well to find oil at Spindletop Hill. On the morning of January 10, 1901, the little hill south of Beaumont, Texas began to tremble and mud bubbled up over the rotary table. A low rumbling sound came from underground, and then, with a force that shot 6 tons of 4-inch (100 mm) diameter pipe out over the top of the derrick, knocking off the crown block, the Lucas Gusher roared in and the Spindletop oil field was born. Spindletop became the focus of frenzied drilling; oil production from the field peaked in 1902 at 17,400,000 barrels (2,770,000 m^{3}), but by 1905 production had declined 90% from the peak.

Spindletop Hill turned out to be the surface expression of an underground salt dome, around which the oil accumulated. The Spindletop gusher started serious oil exploration of the Gulf Coast in Texas and Louisiana, an area that had previously been dismissed by oil men. Other salt dome mounds were quickly drilled, resulting in discoveries at Sour Lake (1902), Batson (1904) and Humble (1905).

The Standard Oil Company was slow to appreciate the economic potential of the Spindletop oil field, and the Gulf Coast generally, which gave greater opportunity to others; Spindletop became the birthplace of oil giants Texaco and Gulf Oil. Although in 1899 Standard Oil controlled more than 85% of the oil production in the older oil regions in the Appalachian Basin and the Lima-Indiana trend, it never controlled more than 10% of the oil production in the new Gulf Coast province.

=== Federal price regulation ===
By the Natural Gas Act of 1938, the federal government imposed price controls on natural gas in interstate commerce. The Federal Power Commission was mandated to set interstate gas prices at "just and reasonable" rates. The FPC at first only regulated the price at which pipelines sold gas to utilities and industry, but later put limits on the wellhead price of gas sold to an interstate pipeline. Gas producers challenged the controls, but lost in the Supreme Court in Phillips Petroleum Co. v. Wisconsin (1954).

The federal government had controlled the price of natural gas that crossed state lines, but not of gas produced and sold within a state. In the 1970s, the low interstate price set by the federal government caused supply shortages of gas in consuming states, because gas producers sold as much as they could of their product for higher prices in the local markets within gas-producing states. In the Natural Gas Policy Act of 1978, the federal government extended price controls to all natural gas in the country. At the same time, the government created a complex price system in which the price paid to the producer depended on the date the well was drilled, the depth of the well, the geological formation, the distance to other gas wells, and several other factors. The price system was an attempt to keep the average price low while encouraging new production.

The last federal price controls on natural gas were removed by the Natural Gas Decontrol Act of 1989, which phased out the last remaining price control as of 1 January 1993.

=== Technology ===
Hydraulic fracturing experiments began in the 1940s in the United States. Massive hydraulic fracturing, generally involving injecting over 150 short tons, or approximately 300,000 pounds (136 metric tonnes), of proppant, was first applied by Pan American Petroleum in Stephens County, Oklahoma, USA in 1968. By the 1970s, massive hydraulic fracturing was employed in Canada, Germany, the Netherlands, and the United Kingdom in the North Sea. Hydraulic fracturing operations have grown exponentially since the mid-1990s, when technologic advances and increases in the price of natural gas made this technique economically viable.

Oil rig technology advanced rapidly in the 20th century, with many innovations made by US companies operating in the Gulf of Mexico. The first jackup oil rig was used in the Gulf of Mexico in 1954.

=== Environmental impact ===
A number of major environmental incidents in the United States in the 20th Century are linked to the petroleum industry.

In 1910, the Lakeview Gusher in Kern County, California was a well blowout that created the largest accidental oil spill in history.

The 1969 Santa Barbara oil spill occurred in the Santa Barbara Channel, near the city of Santa Barbara in Southern California. It was the largest oil spill in United States waters by that time, and now ranks third after the 2010 Deepwater Horizon and 1989 Exxon Valdez spills. It remains the largest oil spill to have occurred in the waters off California. The public outrage engendered by the spill, which received prominent media coverage in the United States, resulted in numerous pieces of environmental legislation within the next several years, legislation that forms the legal and regulatory framework for the modern environmental movement in the U.S.

The 1989 Exxon Valdez oil spill off the coast of Alaska was the largest spill in US waters up to that date, as of 2020 only exceeded by the 2010 Deepwater Horizon oil spill, in terms of volume released.

In 2010 the Deepwater Horizon oil spill in the Gulf of Mexico became the largest marine oil spill in the history of the petroleum industry.

Beginning in 2004, the Taylor oil spill in the Gulf of Mexico continues as of 2020.

== 21st century ==
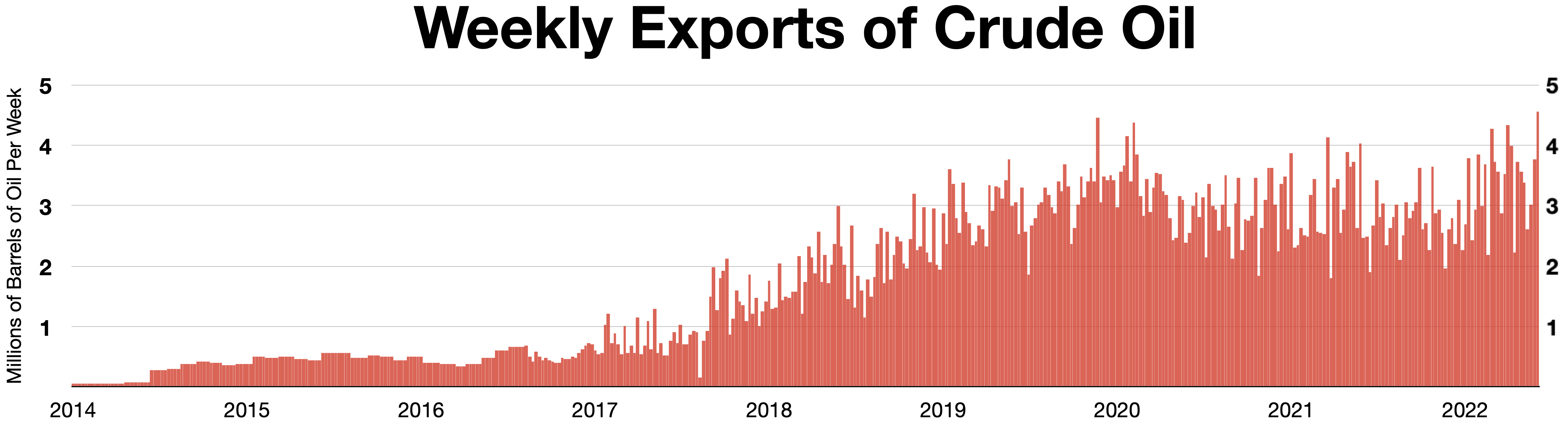
Crude oil exports increased after ending 4 decade ban on oil exports in 2015

=== North Dakota ===
The North Dakota oil boom, lasting from 2006 to 2015, involved rapidly expanding oil extraction from the Bakken formation in the state of North Dakota. The boom began with the discovery of Parshall Oil Field in 2006, and peaked in 2012, but with substantially less growth noted since 2015 due to a global decline in oil prices. The boom relied upon horizontal drilling and hydraulic fracturing to recover oil from tight oil deposits.

=== Keystone Pipeline ===
Commissioned in 2010, the Keystone Pipeline is an oil pipeline system in Canada and the United States, as of 2019 owned solely by TC Energy. It runs from the Western Canadian Sedimentary Basin in Alberta to refineries in Illinois and Texas, and also to oil tank farms and an oil pipeline distribution center in Cushing, Oklahoma. The pipeline became well known when a planned fourth phase, Keystone XL, attracted opposition from environmentalists, becoming a symbol of the battle over climate change and fossil fuels.

== See also ==
- Climate change denial
- ExxonMobil climate change denial
- History of ExxonMobil
  - Petroleum refining in the United States
- Offshore oil and gas in the United States
- Oil industry
- Petroleum industry in the United States
- The Seven Sisters, and its modern equivalent Big Oil
