= Petroleum industry in Ohio =

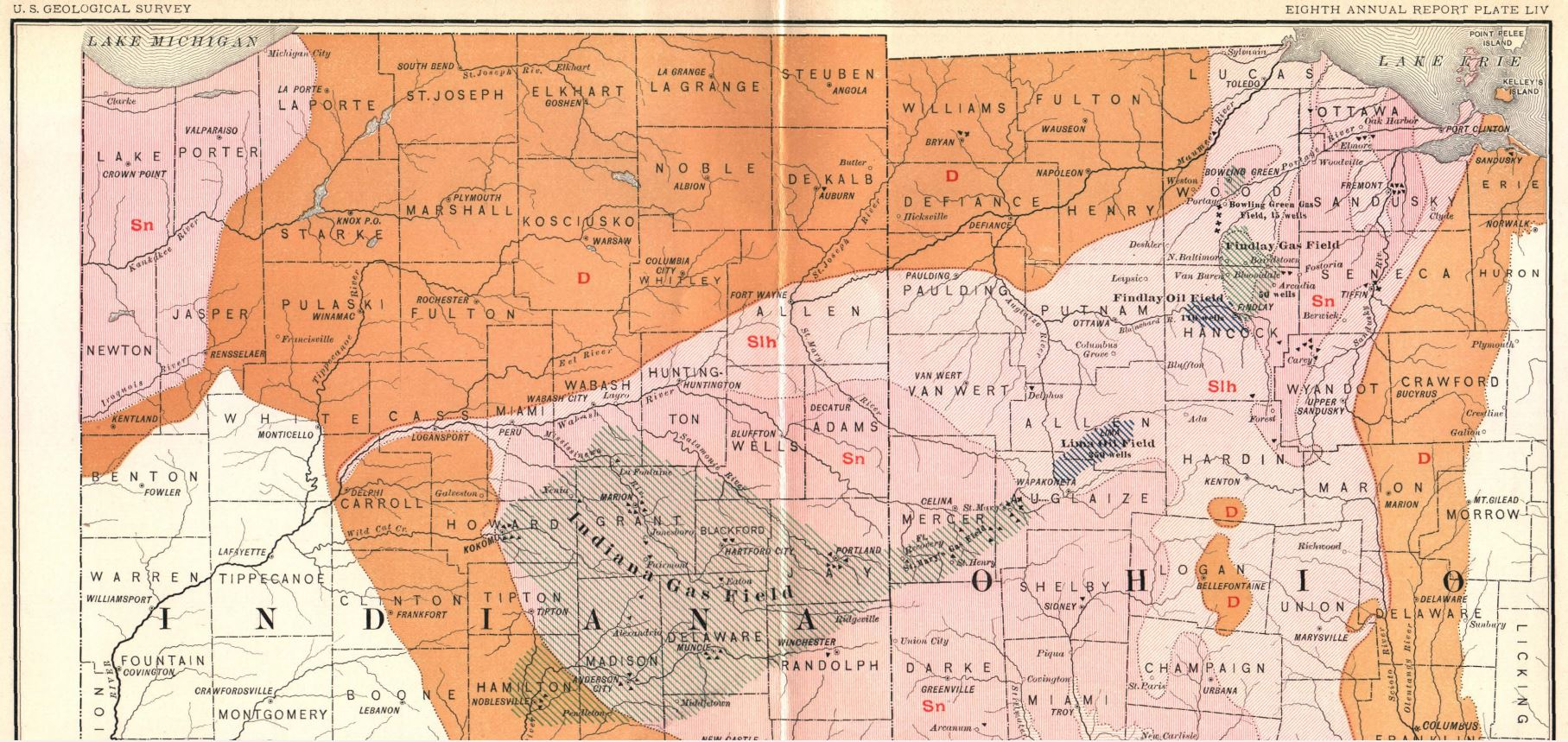
Location of Lima and Findlay Oil Fields

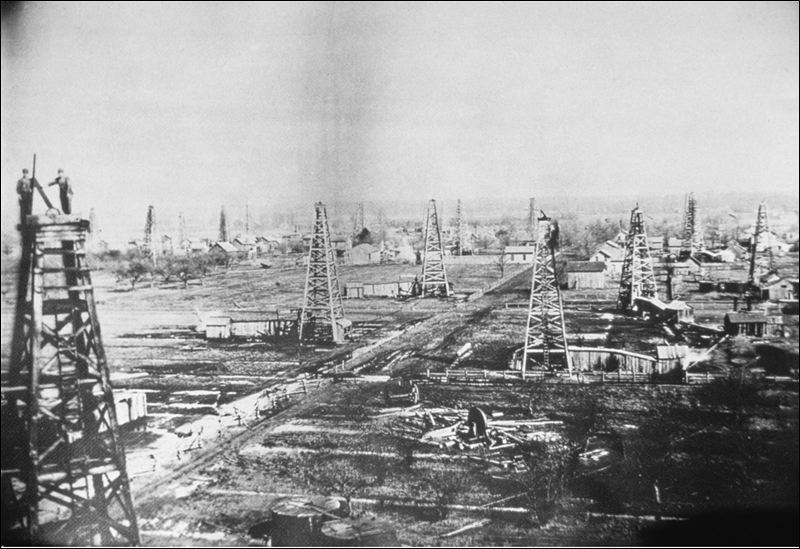
Cygnet, Ohio, in Wood County was a booming oil town with 13 saloons and many workers when this photo was taken in 1885.

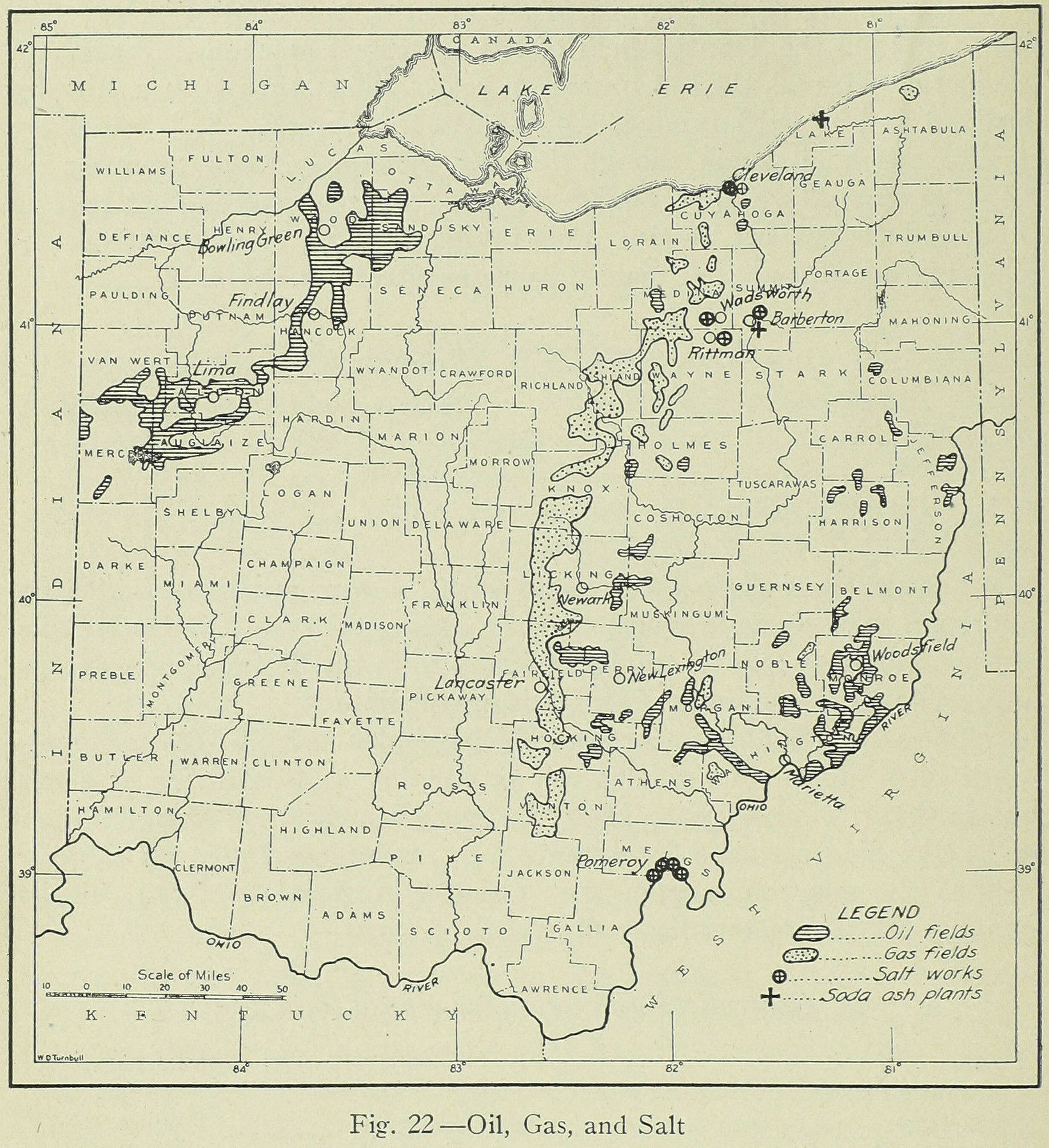
Oil and gas field distribution in Ohio, 1923

The petroleum industry in Ohio dates from 1859. Ohio continues to produce significant quantities of oil and gas, having produced more than 1 billion barrels of oil and 9 trillion cubic feet of natural gas since 1860. Unconventional resources, primarily in eastern Ohio, are likely to increase production in Ohio.

In late 1859, blacksmith William Jeffrey drilled the first well in Ohio specifically intended to produce petroleum. This well is located in Mecca Township, Trumbull County, northeast of Warren. In 1860, similar activity occurred in Macksburg.

== The Ohio Oil Rush ==
Oil production climbed year after year, especially after major oil and gas reserves were found in Wood County in northwest Ohio in the 1880s. From Toledo to Lima and into Indiana, the Bowling Green Fault fractured the Trenton Formation limestone, in which hydrocarbons were trapped by overlying rock. In 1891, the likely first overwater drilling operations in the world occurred in Grand Lake, where more than 100 wells were drilled in less than 10 years. In 1883, Ohio ranked fifth among oil-producing states, behind Pennsylvania, West Virginia, New York, and California; its total production of 47,000 barrels of oil that year was less than one percent of the nation's oil output. But Ohio production climbed rapidly, and in 1895 Ohio became America's leading oil-producing state. Ohio oil production peaked in 1896 at 24 million barrels, but Ohio continued as the leading oil state until 1902, when that title was taken by Oklahoma. The Trenton limestone produced more than 380 million barrels of oil and 2 trillion cubic feet of gas, peaking in 1896 at 23.9 million barrels of oil. Large scale production of oil continued into the 1930s. Due to inefficient early drilling techniques, the oil fields rapidly lost pressure.

=== Natural gas ===
In 1836, gas was encountered when drilling a ten-foot water well in the Findlay field. However, it wasn't until 1884, that a gas well was drilled into the Trenton Limestone, after Dr. Charles Oesterlen organized the Findlay Natural Gas Company. Known as the Pioneer Well, it reached the limestone at a depth of 314 feet, and a gas reservoir at a depth of just over 1000 feet. Then in 1886, the Karg well produced a prodigious amount of gas from a depth of 347 feet. Gas was soon discovered at Bowling Green, and oil at Lima in 1885.

The usefulness of natural gas was not discovered until the 1880s. Up until then, it was considered a “nuisance.” During this period, many towns in Ohio experienced rapid boom-to-bust cycles. Findlay was “the gas capital of Ohio in late 1885.” For example, in Findlay, the first commercial natural gas well began producing in 1884. In 1886, the productive Karg Well (over 10,000,000 cubic feet/day) and other wells resulted in so much gas being flared that Findlay was known as the "City of Light" and free fuel and light attracted many industries, including glass. By 1888, Findlay was one of the largest glass production centers. The gas was assumed to be "inexhaustible". By 1890, gas output began to decline.

=== Production during mid and late 1900s ===
In northwest Ohio, the production of oil was relatively new. The lack of knowledge about the field of industry led to poor management. In turn, it led to much waste during production, resulting in the end of the period's “oil boom.” Although production significantly dropped with reservoir pressure, oil and gas production continued in Ohio. More than 220,000 wells have been drilled in 67 of Ohio's 88 counties, with 60,000 operating as of 2000. These wells have produced more than 1 billion barrels of oil and 9 trillion cubic feet of natural gas. Much of the gas production has occurred in the sandstone formations of eastern Ohio.

== Unconventional prospects ==
In 1814, oil was originally marketed as “cure-all” medicine. It was dug out of salt brine wells in southeast Ohio. Since 2005, the oil and gas industry has developed technologies for producing shale gas and tight oil from low permeability rock. These technologies include horizontal drilling and hydraulic fracturing. This has greatly increased drilling for dry gas from the Marcellus Formation in eastern Ohio, as far south as Washington County, west to Guernsey County, and north to Lake and Ashtabula Counties. Since 2009, this interest has extended to oil and wet gas production from the Utica Shale, with a western boundary line extending from Erie County south to Pickaway County and then southeast to Meigs County on the Ohio River. Large quantities of technically recoverable oil and gas remain in the Trenton and other formations in northwest Ohio and reservoir repressuring and other new technologies may re-invigorate exploration.

== See also ==
- Thorla-McKee Well
- Berea Sandstone
- Pennsylvanian oil rush
- Indiana Gas Boom
- Texas oil boom
- History of the petroleum industry in the United States
- Marathon Oil Company
