= Jonathan Greenleaf Eveleth =

Jonathan Greenleaf Eveleth (May 8, 1821 – December 10, 1861) founded the first oil company in America with George Bissell in 1854. Partners in the Wall Street law firm of Eveleth & Bissell, the two formed the Pennsylvania Rock Oil Company with five other investors from New York, New Haven, and Titusville, Pennsylvania, to "raise, procure, manufacture, and sell Rock Oil."

== Early life and education ==
Eveleth was born in New Gloucester, Maine, on May 8, 1821, to James and Hannah Austin Eveleth. His father was a leather tanner and boot and shoe maker and a descendant of early colonial families of Massachusetts. He was a direct descendant of Joseph Eveleth, juror in the Salem Witch trial of John Proctor, and a second cousin of Theophilus Parsons, Chief Justice of the Supreme Judicial Court of Massachusetts. Eveleth married Mary Weeks of Bath, Maine, in 1852.

He graduated from Bowdoin College in 1847 and Harvard Law School in 1854.

== Career ==
He was Principal of the Liberal Institute (1848–1849) a college preparatory school in Norway, Maine, and then, following law school, joined Fessenden & Deblois, the Portland, Maine law firm of U.S. Representative Thomas Fessenden's family. He later formed his own firm with Bissell in New York at 14 Wall Street. His New York practice was eventually closed in 1859 to allow the partners to fully pursue their oil business venture.

Bissell and Eveleth initially invested $5,000 to purchase and lease over 200 acres (0.81 km^{2}) of what they believed were the principal oil fields in Titusville, PA. The company collected oil in trenches and sold small quantities at high prices ($1.50 per gallon) primarily for medicinal purposes.

Believing in the mineral's greater economic potential and in order to gain the interest of additional investors, the two partners engaged at their own expense renowned Yale chemist, Benjamin Silliman, Jr., to investigate crude oil samples from the Pennsylvania site for its properties and commercial usefulness. Silliman submitted in 1855 his historic report to "Messrs. Eveleth, Bissell, and Reed" concluding, "gentlemen ... there is much ground for encouragement in the belief that your Company have in their possession a raw material from which they may manufacture... very valuable products", thus marking a major scientific milestone for the university as well the birth of the American petroleum industry. The company was then reorganized to include additional New Haven investors, and Silliman was appointed president, with Eveleth and Bissell maintaining controlling interest.

Pennsylvania Rock Oil Company later leased its property to Seneca Oil, which under the management of Edwin Drake, drilled the first oil well in the United States and became the first to strike oil in 1859. Bissell continued to considerably expand his and the New York investors' land in the Titusville region, in Franklin and Petroleum Center, PA. However, Eveleth's life was cut short only 2 years later due to illness. Bissell went on to become known as "the father of the American oil industry".

Eveleth was described as "sage, cautious, and tenacious" and the "principal promoter" of the company who made many of the major decisions.

== Death ==
He died in New York City on December 10, 1861, after suffering from nephritis. His son and only child, Charles W. Eveleth, died in Germany while a student at Ober Gymnasium.
