= Benjamin Silliman Jr. =

American chemist and professor (1816–1885)

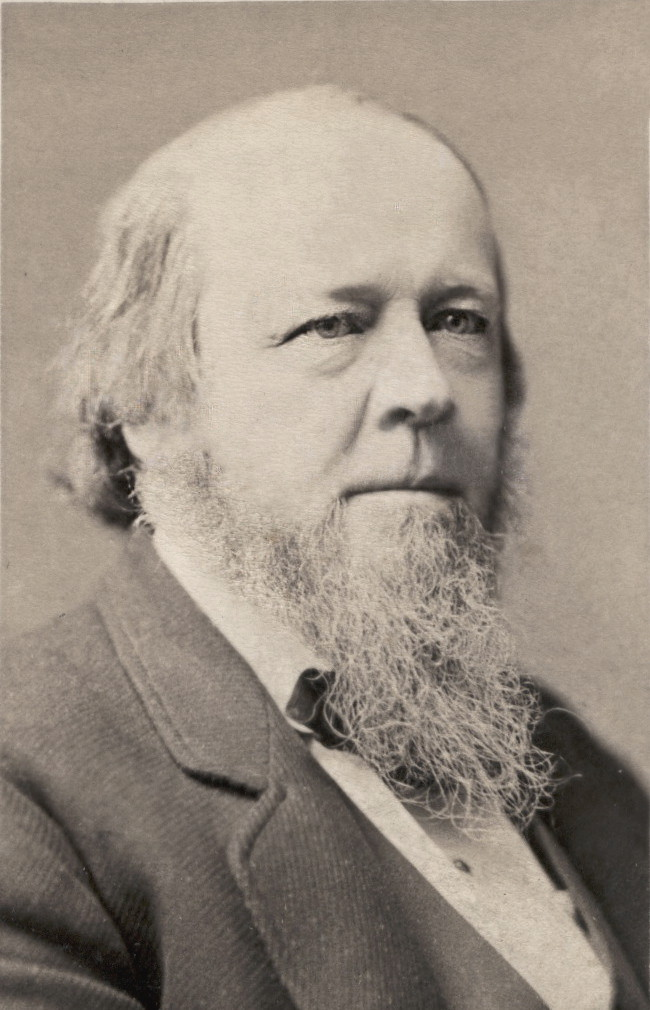
- Silliman, c. 1865
- Born: December 4, 1816; New Haven, Connecticut, U.S.
- Died: January 14, 1885 (aged 68); New Haven, Connecticut, U.S.
- Education: Yale University
- Known for: Oil
- Scientific career
- Fields: Chemistry

Signature
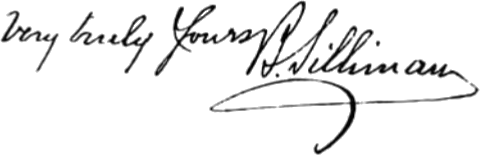

Benjamin Silliman Jr. (December 4, 1816 – January 14, 1885) was a professor of chemistry at Yale University and instrumental in developing the petroleum industry.

His father Benjamin Silliman Sr., also a famous Yale chemist, developed the process of fractional distillation that enabled the economical production of kerosene. In 1855, Silliman Jr. wrote a report for $526.08 on Pennsylvania rock oil and its usefulness as an illuminant that convinced investors to back George Bissell's search for oil.

== Introduction ==
In the 1850s the market for light-producing liquid fuels was dominated by coal oil and by an increasingly inadequate supply of whale oil. However, George Bissell, a lawyer from New York, his partner Jonathan Greenleaf Eveleth, and James Townsend, a New Haven bank president, had a revolutionary idea. They thought there was a possibility of the crude "rock oil" (now petroleum) that had been cropping up in Western Pennsylvania being used as an illuminatory substance. At the time, rock oil was nothing but a smelly hindrance to the well-diggers of the region, with some limited medicinal properties. Yet Bissell and Eveleth, after realizing how flammable the liquid was, believed there was great money to be made in producing rock oil commercially, marketed as lamp fuel and such. But they needed someone—an important, well-respected scientist—whose name they could attach to their financial venture, to research the material to find out whether or not it could be used in such a manner. They found Benjamin Silliman Jr., professor of chemistry at Yale.

== Chemical contribution ==
Benjamin Silliman's primary contribution to the chemical world, and certainly the world as a whole, involved the fractional distillation of petroleum, analyzed mainly for the purpose of its qualities of illumination. He was asked to do this as one of the most prominent chemists of his time, and his report on the subject afterwards had extremely far-reaching influences. The immensely important main idea of his report was that distilled petroleum burned far brighter than any fuel on the market, except those that were far more expensive and less efficient. His conclusion was that petroleum is "a raw material from which...they may manufacture a very valuable product." Silliman also noted that this material was able to survive through large ranges of temperature, and the possibility of it being used as a lubricant.

== Impact of contribution ==
The impact of the discovery of petroleum as a high-quality illuminator is obvious. At the time, however, Bissell and Eveleth simply brought some people together to form the "Pennsylvania Rock Oil Company"- shortly after to be renamed the "Seneca Oil Company," after another common, regional name for petroleum. Edwin Drake was in charge of drilling the well, and after many setbacks, generally revolving around the lack of money, he struck oil in quiet, rural, Titusville, Pennsylvania on August 27, 1859. The scenery of Titusville changed almost overnight. Oil derricks and towns filled with get-rich-quick speculators filled the newly named Oil Creek. The holes were generally unremarkable, especially by the standards of today; the first probably only gathered less than 50 barrels of oil a day. However, the influence of these oil wells, and Benjamin Silliman Jr.'s report confirming the use of petroleum as an illuminant, was massive. Almost equally important in Bissell's idea and Silliman's discovery was the use of rock oil for lubrication of the many moving parts in the mechanical age soon to come.

== Mining consultant ==
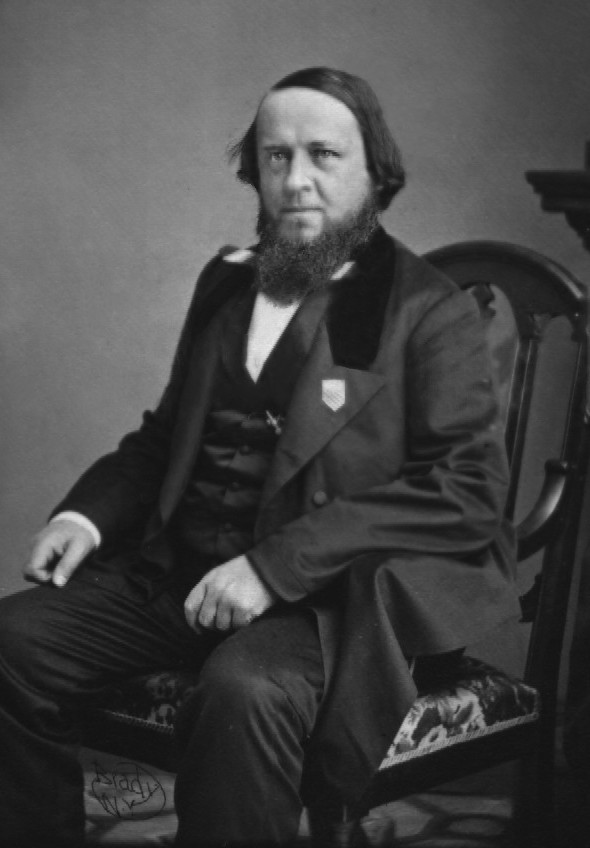
Benjamin Silliman Jr.

Silliman's fame as an oil pioneer put him in great demand as a consultant to mining companies, a line of work in which he was much less successful. His great overestimate of the ore reserves in the Emma mine near Alta, Utah contributed to a financial fiasco for British investors when the mine exhausted its ore years ahead of Silliman's prediction. He also reported very optimistically on the mines at Lake Valley, New Mexico, which were also money-losers for shareholders.

== Influences ==
Benjamin Silliman Sr. was clearly the largest inspiration in Benjamin Silliman Jr.'s career. Both Sillimans were eminent chemists and professors of the subject at Yale University. The father was the first professor of chemistry at Yale in 1802, and studied the subject at the Medical College of the University of Pennsylvania. He was also professor of natural history—which was defined as geology, mineralogy, zoology, and botany—all of which he studied at the University of Edinburgh. His work in those areas established Yale's rock and mineral collection as the most significant in America at the time. With his help, Yale became the foremost center of science in 19th-century America. Benjamin Silliman Sr. is considered by many to be the father of American chemistry. With the exception of Silliman Jr.'s involvement in the oil boom, there are many similarities between the careers of both Sillimans.

Silliman's wife, Susan Huldah Forbes, was a descendant of Joel Root, an early entrepreneur and supercargo on the sealing ship Huron. Root wrote a journal, A Voyage Around the World Made by Joel Root 1802-1806, later published in a limited edition of eight copies by Alice Belknap Hawkes, descendant of the Silliman, Root, and Forbes families.

Silliman's daughters, Alice and Susan, were the first two students to enroll at the Yale School of Fine Arts when it opened in 1869.

== See also ==
- The Prize: The Epic Quest for Oil, Money, and Power
