= Petroleum Center, Pennsylvania =

Ghost town in Pennsylvania, US

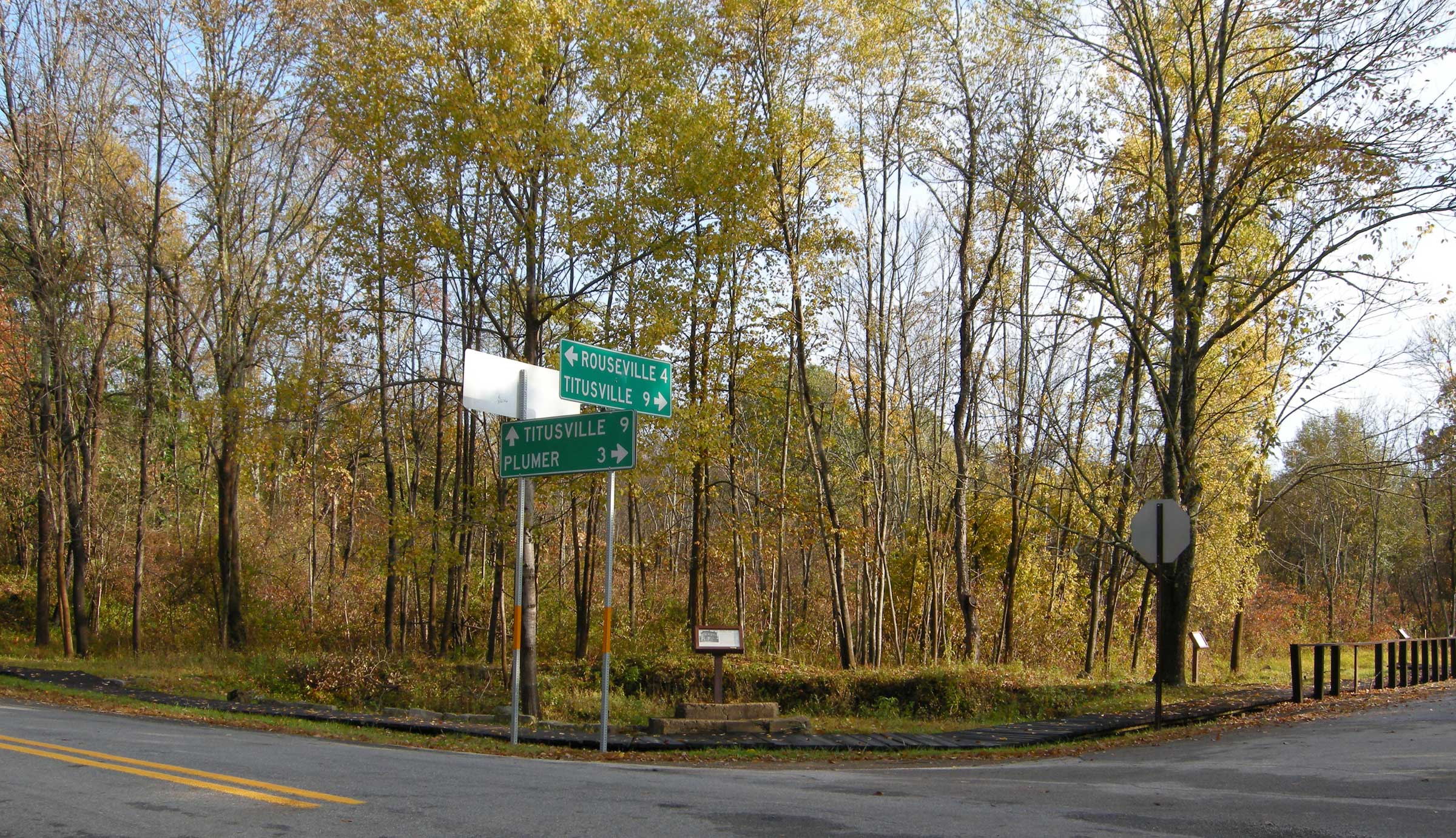
Site of the former downtown of Petroleum Center, taken in 2009. Visible on the corner is part of the stone foundation of a bank building.

Petroleum Center is a populated place and ghost town in Cornplanter Township, Venango County, Pennsylvania, United States. In the 19th century, the name was also spelled "Petroleum Centre". The town today is almost deserted.

== Geography ==
Petroleum Center is located at 41°30′58″N 79°40′57″W (41.516, -79.682), at an elevation of 1,070 feet (330 m) above sea level, along the banks of Oil Creek. It is most easily found on local maps at the intersection of Petroleum Center Road and Russell Corners Road, within Oil Creek State Park, approximately five miles north-northeast of Oil City. Petroleum Center lies near the tracks of the Oil Creek and Titusville Railroad.

== History ==
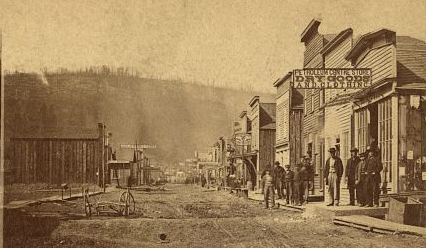
Main Street in Petroleum Center in the 19th century

As the name implies, Petroleum Center was developed during the Pennsylvanian oil rush of the mid-19th century. The first well was drilled on the George Washington McClintock farm in 1860. A small community grew about halfway between Oil City and Titusville. George Henry Bissell, James Bishop and others formed the Central Petroleum Company which owned the farm in the beginning of 1866, when daily production topped 1,000 barrels. By the summer of 1866, over 3,000 people called the town home with a bank, two churches, a theater, a half-dozen hotels/boarding houses, and stores serving all the needs of the growing community. Bissel & Co. Banking House stimulated economic growth with its direct ties to financial institutions in New York City. President Ulysses S. Grant visited the town in 1871. When a fire devastated the nearby town of Pithole, that town's newspaper, the Pithole Daily Record, was relocated to Petroleum Center. The town was founded in 1866 and was essentially abandoned after 1873.

== Notable people ==
- James F. Burke, former U.S. Representative

== See also ==
- Oil Creek Railroad
