= Thorla-McKee Well =

Coordinates: 39°44′23″N 81°29′53″W

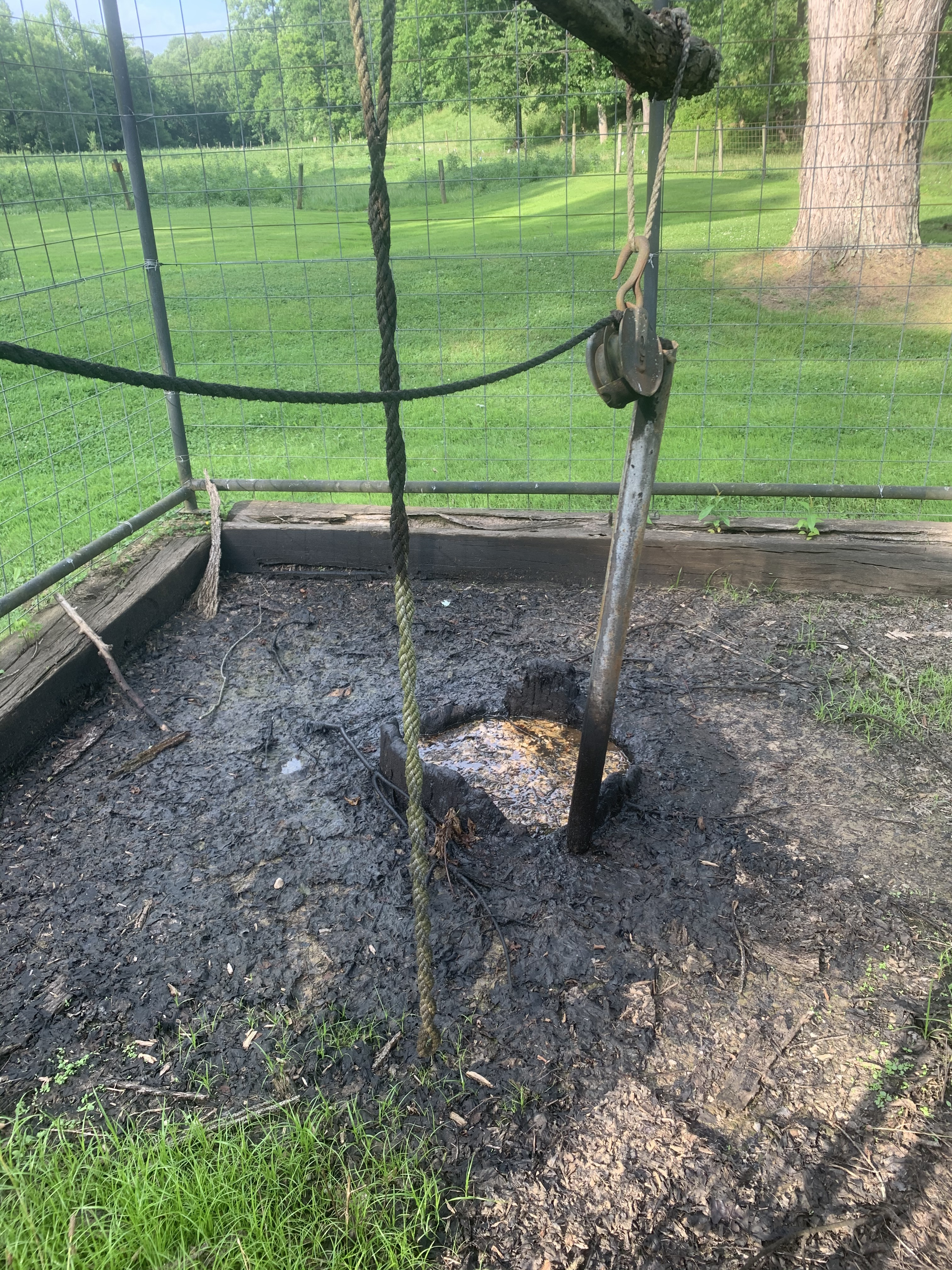
A high fence surrounds the Thorla-Mckee Well. Oil, gas, and brine seep from the well-head. Parts of the original wood casing are visible. Above the well sits a replica spring-pole.

The Thorla-McKee Well in Noble County, Ohio was the first oil-producing well in North America according to the Ohio Historical Society.

Dedicated in 1992 by the Noble County Department of Tourism and the Ohio Historical Society, a designation marker sits within 1-mile (1.6 km) of Caldwell, Ohio to recognize the site. The plaque reads:

"Salt was an important commodity to early settlers because of its use in daily living. In 1814 Silas Thorla and Robert McKee dug a well in search of salt brine. They discovered salt, and by accident, discovered oil. Oil's value was unknown to them so they had to separate the oil from the salt water by soaking the oil up from the surface with blankets. The oil was wrung from the blankets, bottled as "Seneca Oil," and sold as a "cure all." The remaining brine was boiled down to extract the salt."

After the Thorla-McKee well, other wells drilled for salt brine in Kentucky and West Virginia also produced oil and gas as byproducts. The Drake Well, drilled in Pennsylvania in 1859, is generally recognized as the first well in the United States drilled for oil itself.

== See also ==
- Petroleum industry in Ohio
