= Edwin Drake =

American businessman (1819–1880)

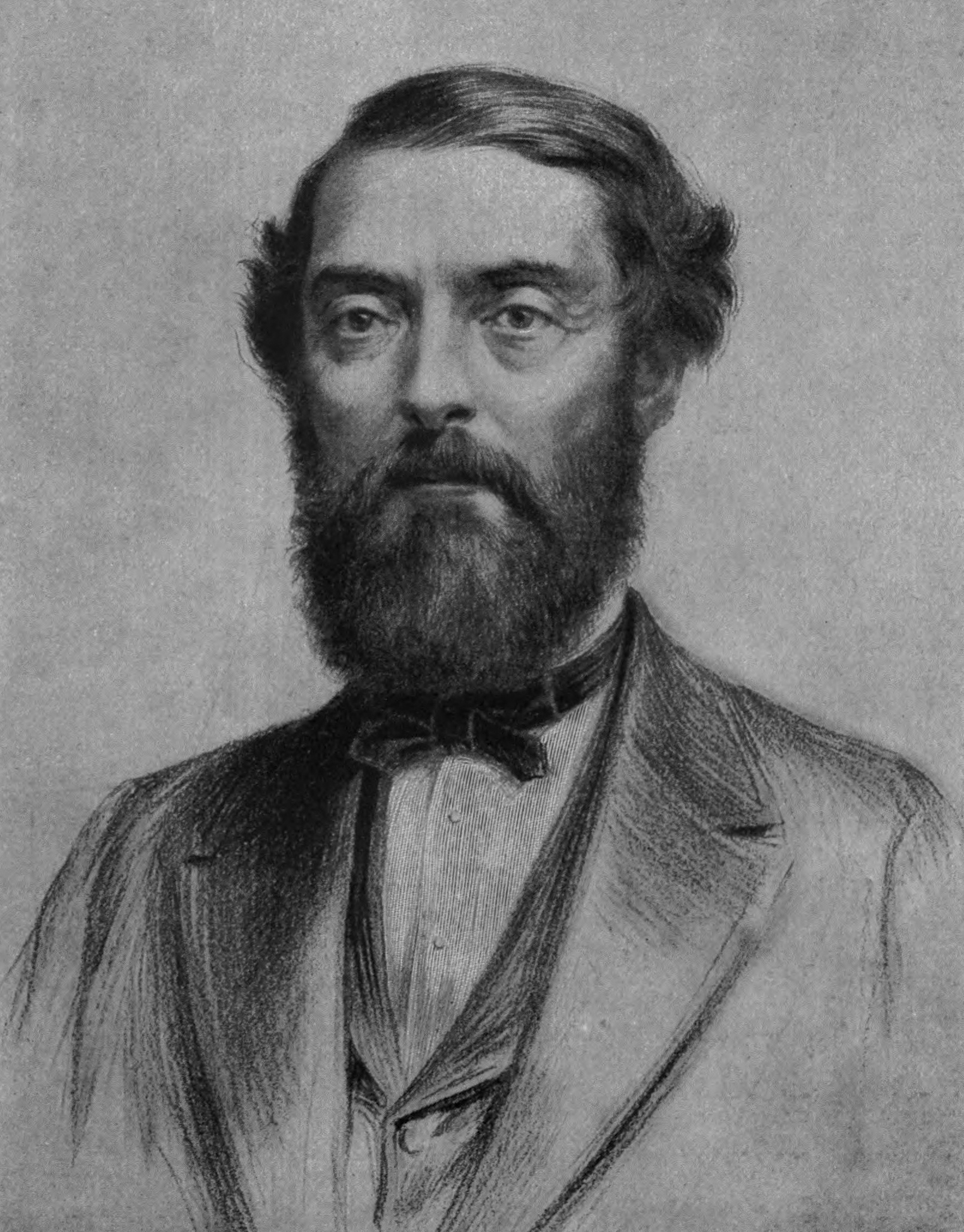
- A 19th century illustration of Drake
- Born: Edwin Laurentine Drake; March 29, 1819; Greenville, New York, U.S.
- Died: November 9, 1880 (aged 61); Bethlehem, Pennsylvania, U.S.
- Other name: Colonel Drake
- Occupation: Businessman
- Known for: Petroleum exploration
- Parent(s): Lyman Drake and Laura Lee

Edwin Laurentine Drake (March 29, 1819 – November 9, 1880), also known as Colonel Drake, was an American businessman and the first American to drill the first successful commercial oil well.

== Early life ==
Drake was born in Greenville, New York, on March 29, 1819, the son of Lyman and Laura Drake. He grew up on family farms around New York state and Castleton, Vermont, before leaving home at the age of 19. He spent the early parts of his life working the railways around New Haven, Connecticut, as a clerk, express agent, and conductor. Drake was a Freemason.

== Career ==
=== Seneca Oil ===
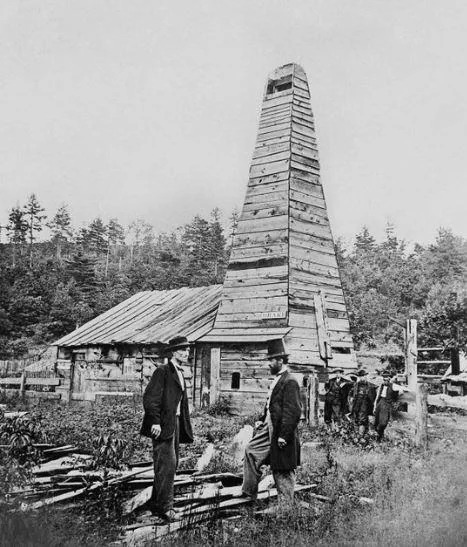
Drake with the nation's first oil well near Titusville, Pennsylvania

While petroleum oil was known prior to this, there was no appreciable market for it. Samuel Kier is credited with founding the first American oil refinery in Pittsburgh, in 1853. He was the first person in the United States to refine crude oil into kerosene. Along with a new lamp to burn Kier's product, a new market to replace whale oil as a lamp oil began to develop.

Seneca Oil Company, originally called the Pennsylvania Rock Oil Company, was founded by George Bissell and Jonathan Eveleth. They created the company after hearing of reports that petroleum collected from an oil spring in Titusville, Pennsylvania, was suitable for use as lamp fuel. Until this time, the primary lamp fuel had been whale oil. Bissell found that the rock oil would be a practical alternative if a method could be devised to extract the oil from the ground. Interest in the Pennsylvania Rock Oil Company was initially low until a report commissioned by Bissell and Eveleth showed that there was significant economic value in petroleum. Due to a disagreement between the shareholders and the pair, the company was split and Seneca Oil was formed in 1858. Before being offered a job by Bissell and Eveleth, Drake bought stock in Seneca Oil. But his job opportunity with the company arose because both parties were staying in the same hotel in Titusville. He was hired on a salary of $1,000 a year to investigate the oil seeps on land owned by Seneca Oil.

Drake was hired by the Seneca Oil Company to investigate suspected oil deposits in Titusville, Pennsylvania. James Townsend, President of the Seneca Oil Company, sent Drake to the site in the spring of 1858. The oil company chose the retired railway man partly because he had free use of the rail. Drake had no military experience, but Townsend gave him the title of "Colonel" in order to impress the local townspeople.

=== Drake Well ===
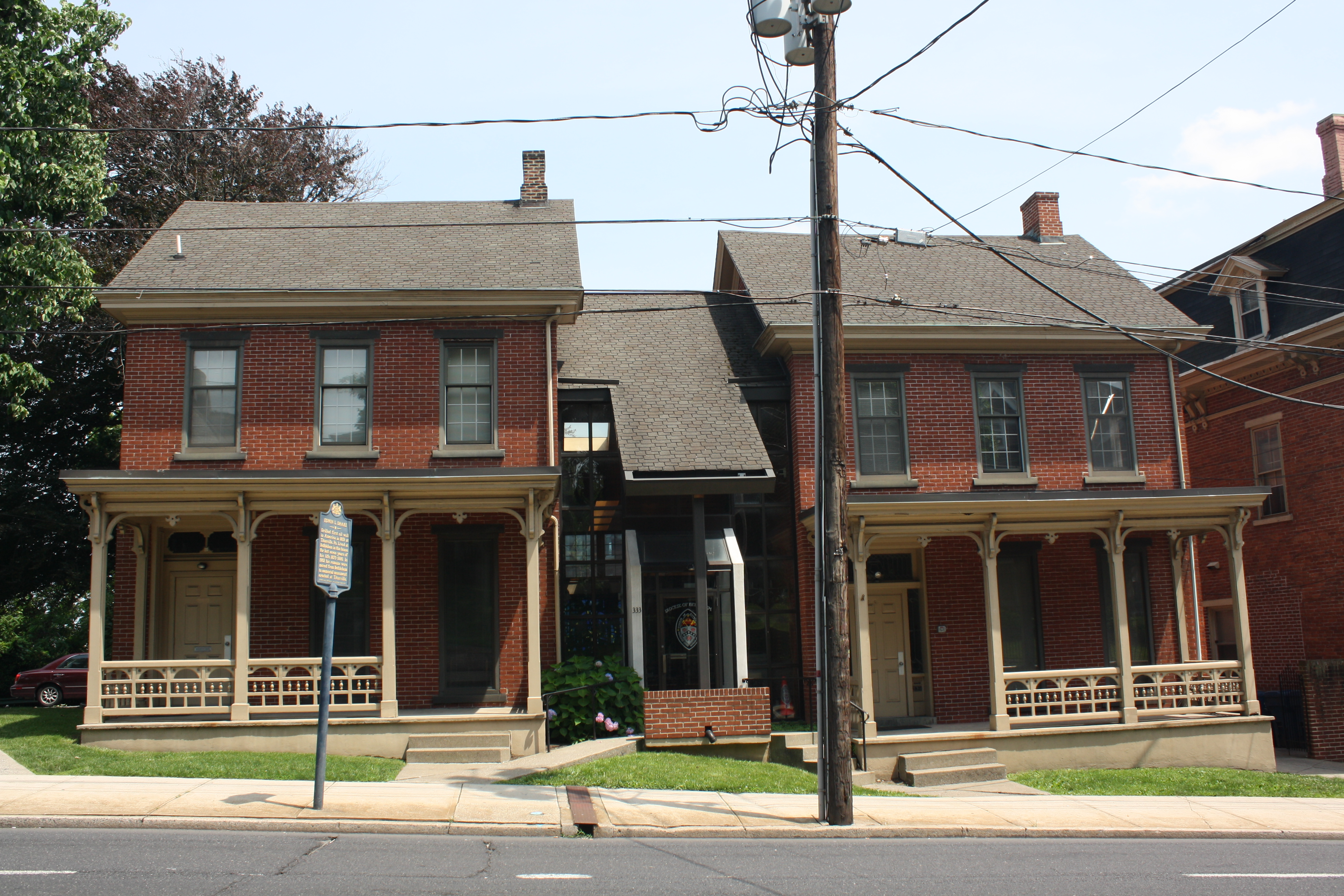
The Fountain Hill, Pennsylvania, home where Drake lived the last seven years of his life, from 1873 until 1880

Drake decided to drill in the manner of salt well drillers. He purchased a steam engine in Erie, Pennsylvania, to power the drill. The well was dug on an island on the Oil Creek. It took some time for the drillers to get through the layers of gravel. At 16 feet (4.9 m) the sides of the hole began to collapse. Those helping him began to despair, but not Drake. It was at this point that he devised the idea of a drive pipe. This cast iron pipe consisted of 10-foot-long (3.0 m) joints. The pipe was driven down into the ground. At 32 feet (9.8 m) they struck bedrock. The drilling tools were now lowered through the pipe and steam was used to drill through the bedrock. The drilling, however, was slow. Progress was made at the rate of just 3 feet (0.91 m) per day. After initial difficulty locating the necessary parts to build the well, which resulted in his well-being nicknamed "Drake's Folly", Drake proved successful.

Crowds of people began to gather to jeer at the apparently unproductive operation. By 1859, Drake was also running out of money. Drake's colleagues back in Connecticut gave up on finding any oil by April 1859 and after spending $2,500, Drake took out a $500 loan to keep the operation going. On August 27, 1859, Drake had persevered and his drill bit had reached a total depth of 69.5 feet (21.2 m). At that point the bit hit a crevice. The men packed up for the day. The next morning Drake's driller, Billy Smith, looked into the hole in preparation for another day's work. He was surprised and delighted to see crude oil rising up. Drake was summoned and the oil was brought to the surface with a hand pitcher pump. The oil was collected in a bath tub.

Drake is famous for pioneering a new method for producing oil from the ground. He drilled using piping to prevent borehole collapse, allowing for the drill to penetrate further and further into the ground. Previous methods for collecting oil had been limited. Ground collection of oil consisted of gathering it from where it occurred naturally, such as from oil seeps or shallow holes dug into the ground. Drake tried the latter method initially when looking for oil near Titusville, Pennsylvania. However, it failed to produce economically viable amounts of oil. Alternative methods of digging large shafts into the ground also failed, as collapse from water seepage almost always occurred. The significant step that Drake took was to drive a 32-foot (9.8 m) iron pipe through the ground into the bedrock below. This allowed Drake to drill inside the pipe, without the hole collapsing from the water seepage. The principle behind this idea is still employed today by all companies drilling for hydrocarbons.

Claims of prior art exist, including in Bóbrka, Poland, in 1854; Wietze, Germany, in 1857; and Oil Springs, Ontario, Canada, in 1858. The importance of the Drake Well near Titusville was that it prompted the first great wave of investment and additional drilling that established petroleum as a major industry. Within a day of Drake's striking oil, Drake's methods were being imitated by others along Oil Creek and in the immediate area. This culminated with the establishment of several oil boom towns along the creek. Drake's well produced 25 barrels (4.0 m^{3}) of oil a day. By 1872, the entire area was producing 15.9 thousand barrels (2,530 m^{3}) a day.

Drake set up a stock company to extract and market the oil. But, while his pioneering work led to the growth of an oil industry that made many people fabulously rich, for Drake riches proved elusive. Drake failed to patent his drilling invention, and proceeded to lose all of his savings in oil speculation in 1863. He ended up impoverished. In 1872, Pennsylvania voted an annuity of $1,500 to the "crazy man" whose determination founded the oil industry.

== Personal life ==
In 1845, he married Philena Adams, who died while giving birth to their second child in 1854. Drake remarried three years later to Laura Dowd, sixteen years his junior, in 1857. During the summer of 1857, illness prevented Drake from carrying on with his job. He retained the privileges of a train conductor, including free travel on the railroads. In 1858, the Drake family relocated to Titusville, Pennsylvania, and in 1874 to Bethlehem, Pennsylvania, in the Lehigh Valley region of eastern Pennsylvania.

== Death ==
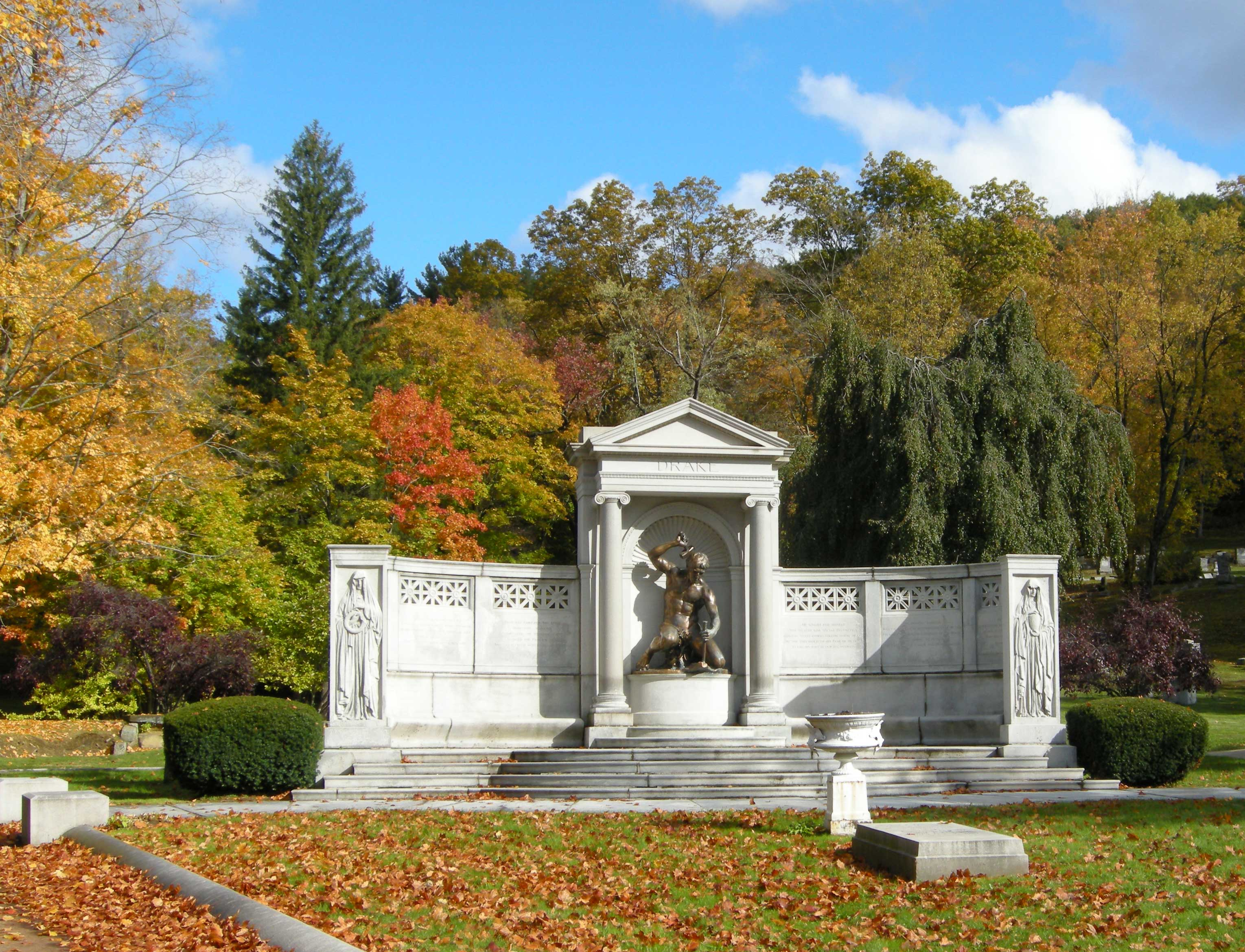
Drake's grave and memorial in Titusville, Pennsylvania

He died on November 9, 1880, in Bethlehem, Pennsylvania. He and his wife are interred in Titusville, Pennsylvania, next to a memorial built in his honor.

== Legacy ==
In 1934, the Drake Well Museum was opened in Titusville, Pennsylvania, highlighting Drake's career and role as the nation's first successful oil driller.

== In popular culture ==
- In 1954, Drake was portrayed by Vincent Price in Born In Freedom: The Story of Colonel Drake, sponsored by the American Petroleum Institute.
- The Lucky Luke adventure In the Shadow of the Derricks sees the main character travel to Titusville to help Drake against an enemy that wants to own all the region's oil fields by all means.
- The 13th episode of The Great Adventure (1963), "The Colonel from Connecticut", sees Drake, looking to find purpose in his life, travel to Titusville to discover a way to extract petroleum from the ground in a way never done before.

== See also ==
- Drake Well Museum
- Pennsylvania oil rush
