= Samuel Kier =

American inventor and businessman (1813–1874)

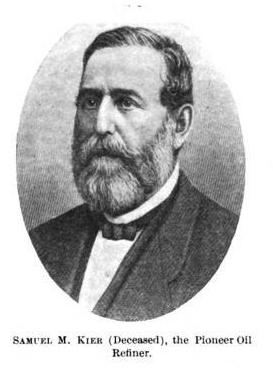

Samuel Martin Kier (July 19, 1813 – October 6, 1874) was an American inventor and businessman who is credited with founding the American petroleum refining industry. He was the first person in the United States to refine crude oil into kerosene lamp oil. Kier has been dubbed the Grandfather of the American Oil Industry by historians.

== Biography ==
Kier was born in Conemaugh Township, Indiana County, Pennsylvania near the town of Livermore. He was the son of Thomas Kier and Mary Martin Kier. The Kiers were Scots-Irish immigrants who owned several salt wells around Livermore and nearby Saltsburg.

In addition to the salt business, Samuel helped found Kier, Royer and Co., in 1838. The company was a canal boat operation that shipped coal between Pittsburgh and Philadelphia. Kier also owned interest in several coal mines, a brickyard, and a pottery factory.

He, along with several other investors including Benjamin Franklin Jones, founded several iron foundries in west central Pennsylvania. The iron business would be the forerunner of the Jones and Laughlin Steel Company, one of the largest steel producers in America.

Kier married Nancy Eicher of Greensburg, Pennsylvania in 1842.

== Business career ==
Samuel Kier moved to Pittsburgh at the age of 21. In Pittsburgh, he found employment with a railway express company, where he recognized his business acumen. He soon became a partner in the expanding enterprise, but the business eventually collapsed during the economic downturn of the Panic of 1837.

Samuel Kier rebounded from the failure of his first business by exploring new opportunities. In 1838, he ventured into canal transportation, utilizing Pennsylvania's extensive canal system connecting Lake Erie to Pittsburgh and Philadelphia. Kier hired several independent canal operators of the Pennsylvania Canal to establish a continuous route from Pittsburgh to Philadelphia and formed Kier, Roger, and Company to manage the operation. This enterprise proved financially successful, allowing Kier to settle any outstanding debts from his previous business.

When the government began constructing the Pennsylvania Railroad, which paralleled Kier's canal route, he adapted his canal business. In 1846, Kier, in partnership with James Buchannan, later President of the United States, established "Independent Line," working with special section where "amphibious" canal boats boats which could be taken apart and put on railroad cars where they were available, or put together and pulled along the canal system where there was no railroad. When later partnered with Benjamin Jones (of Jones and Laughlin Steel Company), this canal boat company eventually became, the "Mechanics Line." This innovative transportation method thrived until the railroad's completion in 1854, at which point Kier ceased the production and operation of the hybrid boats. But by 1854 with expanded railroad competition, the canal boat Company was discontinued and Kier, Buchannan, and Jones went into the fire-brick business in Bolivar, Pennsylvania (later moved to Salina, Pennsylvania). They, Kier and Jones, also purchased iron furnaces at Armaugh, near Johnstown, Pennsylvania. By the time he terminated his canal business, Kier had diversified into several other ventures, including a firebrick and pottery factory, investments in steel and iron, and notably, his involvement in the oil industry.

By the 1840s, Kier's salt wells were becoming fouled with petroleum. At first, Kier simply dumped the useless oil into the nearby Pennsylvania Main Line Canal, but after an oil slick caught fire, he saw a way to profit from this otherwise worthless byproduct. With no formal training in science or chemistry, he began experimenting with several distillates of the crude oil along with a chemist from eastern Pennsylvania. He developed a substance he named "Rock Oil" and later "Seneca Oil". In 1848, he began packaging the substance as a patent medicine charging $0.50 per bottle. He also produced petroleum butter (petroleum jelly) and sold it as a topical ointment. Neither product proved to be a commercial success.

After further experimenting, he discovered an economical way to produce kerosene. Kerosene had been known for some time but was not widely produced and was considered to have little economic value. But at the time whale oil, the principal fuel for lamps in America, was becoming increasingly scarce and expensive.

Kier began selling the kerosene, named "Carbon Oil", to local miners in 1851. He also invented a new lamp to burn his product. Kier never obtained a patent for his developments and many other inventors and businessmen would go on to improve upon his work yielding huge fortunes. Even so, Kier's income at the time exceeded US$40,000 per year, a huge sum for the time.

Kier established America's first oil refinery in Pittsburgh on Seventh avenue near Grant Street, in 1853. A marker identifying the site reads "Kier Refinery – Using a five-barrel still, Samuel M. Kier erected on this site about 1854 the first commercial refinery to produce illuminating oil from petroleum. He used crude oil from salt wells at Tarentum." Kier consulted with Edwin Drake concerning Drake's experimental oil well.
