= Environment of Pennsylvania =

Pennsylvania is a northeastern commonwealth located in the United States of America. It was one of the 13 original colonies. Pennsylvania is home to a population of 12,802,503 individuals and various different types of environments. Pennsylvania is known for its many hills, plateaus, mountains and valleys. In fact, Pennsylvania is 50 percent forest land with the only lowlands located in the southeast.

== Mountains ==
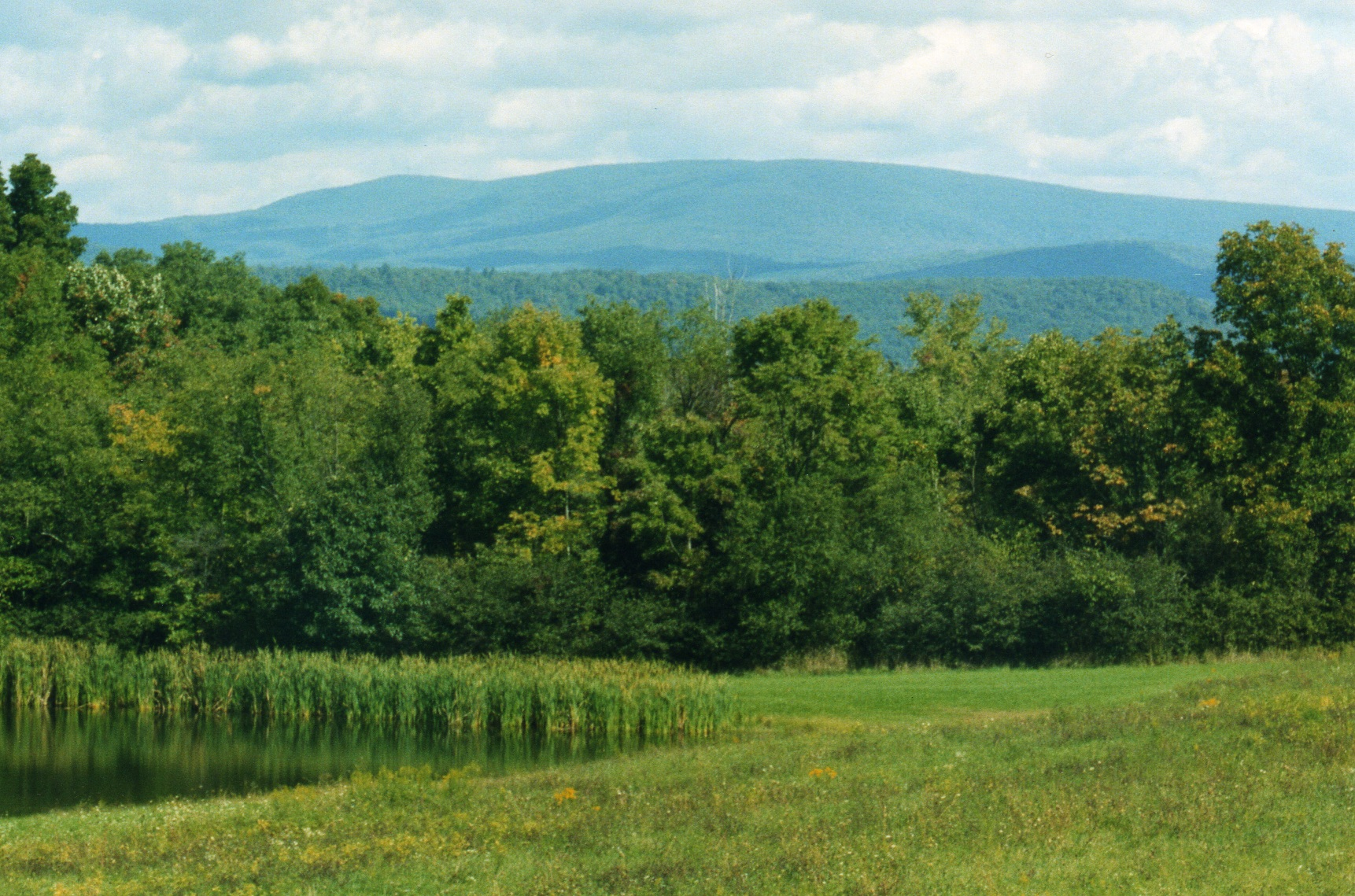
Blue Knob Mountain in the Quaker Valley of Pennsylvania

Pennsylvania has many different mountain ranges with the highest point being at 3,213 feet on Mt. Davis. The main mountain ranges include the Appalachian, Allegheny and Pocono Mountains. The Appalachian Mountain Range runs throughout Pennsylvania and seventeen other states, creating the largest mountain range in Pennsylvania. The Allegheny Mountain Range connects to the Appalachian Mountains in west and central Pennsylvania. The Pocono Mountain Range runs throughout northeastern Pennsylvania. The Allegheny and Pocono mountains are the two largest subranges in Pennsylvania. Other mountain ranges in Pennsylvania include the Bear Pond Mountains, the Blue Ridge Mountains, the Conewago Mountains, Music Mountains, Town Hill Mountain Range, and the Endless Mountains. To find a full list of mountains in Pennsylvania look at Category:Mountain ranges of Pennsylvania.

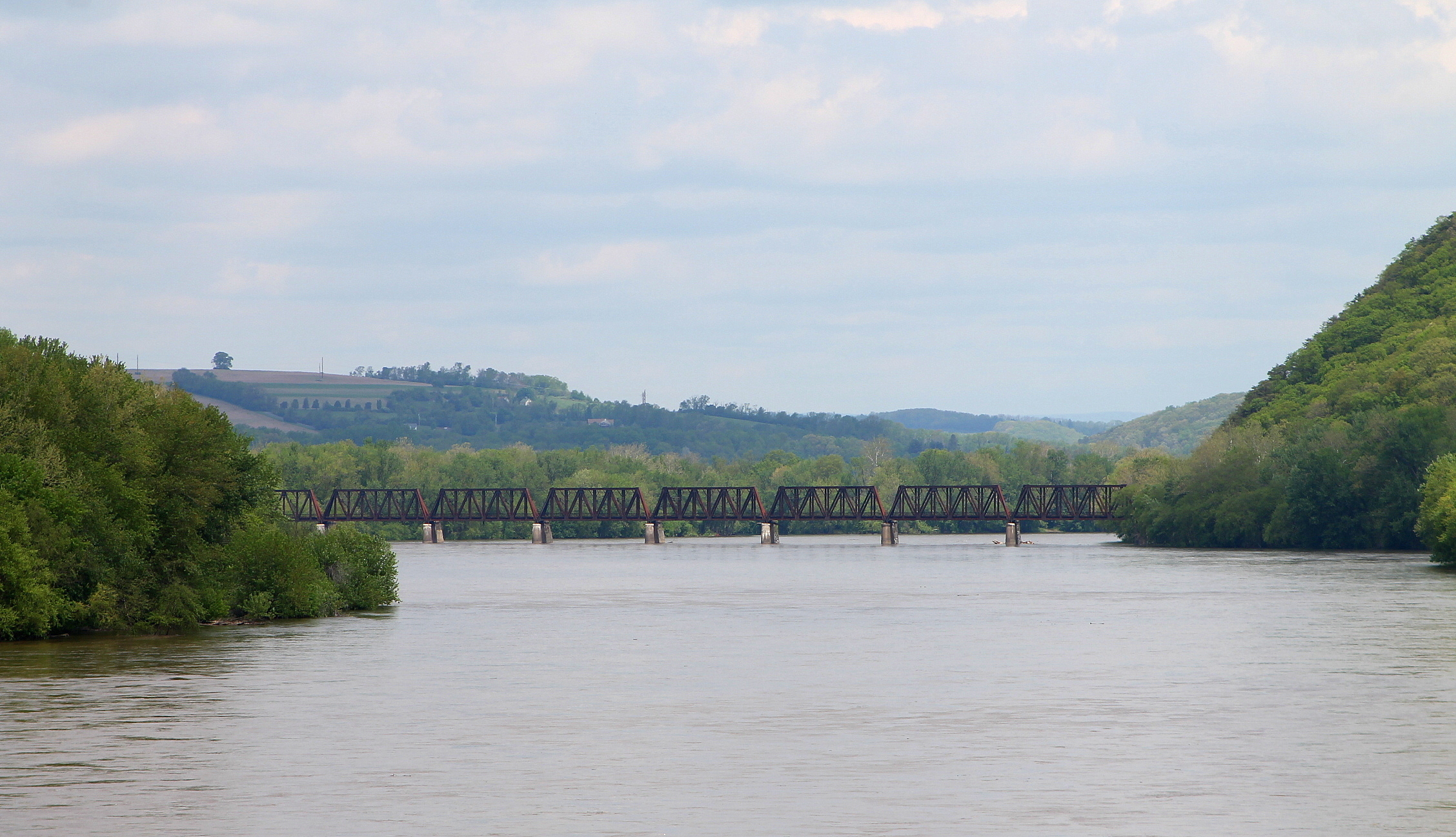
Susquehanna River

== Rivers ==
Pennsylvania also has more significant waterways than any other US state. In fact, Pennsylvania has more than 83,000 miles of rivers, creeks, and streams. The main waterways are the Delaware River, Allegheny River, Ohio River, Monongahela River and the Susquehanna River. Every Pennsylvania river is categorized into five classifications by the Pennsylvania Scenic Rivers. The classifications are wild, scenic, pastoral, recreational, or modified recreational. Any individual river can have more than one classification, but they all have at least one.

== Landfills in Pennsylvania ==
Pennsylvania also has a vast amount of landfills. In total, Pennsylvania has 45 municipal waste landfills, 3 construction/demolition waste landfills, 4 residual waste landfills, and 6 trash incinerators. Below is a table of the 45 municipal landfills and their daily volume of trash entering the landfills daily. These landfills are not only holding the trash of the citizens of Pennsylvania, but they also hold the trash of other states. Pennsylvania is one of the main states that imports waste. Much of Pennsylvania's waste comes from neighboring states such as New Jersey and New York. In fact, Pennsylvania has more trash per person at 34.5 tons of trash per person than every other US state except Nevada in 2016. However, this process of importing waste is very lucrative for the Pennsylvania counties by providing labor market opportunities and helps increase the municipality's budgets by fees paid by these exporting states. For example, Throop, Pennsylvania $6 million budget is made up of $4 million from the host feels paid from importing other state's waste.

Landfill Name	Daily Volume (tons)	County
Fairless Landfill	adv: 18,333 mdv: 20,000	Bucks
GROWS North Landfill	adv: 18,333 mdv: 20,000	Bucks
Tullytown Landfill	adv: 18,333 mdv: 20,000	Bucks
SECCRA Landfill	adv: 375 mdv: 700	Chester
IESI Bethlehem Landfill	adv: 1,375 mdv: 1,800	North Hampton
Commonwealth Environmental Systems	adv: 4,750 mdv: 5,000	Schuylkill
Chrin Brothers Sanitary Landfill	adv: 1,500 mdv: 2,000	Northampton
Alliance Landfill	adv: 3,000 mdv: 5,500	Lackawanna
Grand Central Landfill	adv: 2,750 mdv: 3,000	Northampton
Keystone Sanitary Landfill	adv: 7,250 mdv: 7,500	Lackawanna
Advanced Disposal Services Sandy Run Landfill	adv: 750 mdv: 1,000	Bedford
Conestoga Landfill	adv: 5,210 mdv: 10,000	Berks
Rolling Hills Landfill	adv: 3,200 mdv: 3,840	Berks
Cumberland County Landfill	adv: 2,500 mdv: 2,950	Cumberland
LCSWMA Frey Farm Landfill	adv: 1,500 mdv: 2,000	Lancaster
Greater Lebanon Refuse Authority Landfill	adv: 520 mdv: 1,100	Lebanon
Lanchester Landfill	adv: 1,650 mdv: 1,850	Lancaster
Modern Landfill	adv: 4,667 mdv: 5,000	York
Mountain View Reclamation	adv: 1,800 mdv: 2,000	Franklin
Pioneer Crossing	adv: 1,000 mdv: 1,600	Berks
IESI Blue Ridge Landfill	adv: 1,700 mdv: 2,000	Franklin
Western Berks Landfill	adv: 1,000 mdv: 1,250	Berks
Bradford County Landfill	adv: 500 mdv: 750	Bradford
Wayne Township Landfill	adv: 1,200 mdv: 1,500	Clinton
Lycoming County Landfill	adv: 1,600 mdv: 2,000	Lycoming
Arden Landfill	adv: 2,400 adv: 2,800	Washington
Chestnut Valley Landfill	adv: 1,200 mdv: 1,500	Fayette
Greenridge Reclamation	adv: 2,500 mdv: 2,500	Westmoreland
Imperial Landfill	adv: 3,100 mdv: 4,666	Allegheny
J.J. Brunner, Inc. Landfill	adv: 425 mdv: 525	Beaver
Kelly Run Sanitation	adv: 1,250 mdv: 1,750	Allegheny
Laurel Highland Landfill	adv: 2,000 mdv: 2,500	Cambria
South Hills Landfill	adv: 2,280 mdv: 2,850	Washington
Monroevill Landfill	adv: 1,800 mdv: 2,200	Allegheny
Mostoller Landfill	adv: 2,000 mdv: 2,400	Somerset
Evergreen Landfill	adv: 1,000 mdv: 1,500	Indiana
Shade Landfill	adv: 2,900 mdv: 3,500	Somerset
Tervita Sanitary Landfill	adv: 2,900 mdv: 3,500	Westmoreland
Southern Alleghenies	adv: 2,200 mdv: 3,300	Somerset
Valley Landfill	adv: 2,600 mdv: 4,000	Westmoreland
Greentree Landfill	adv: 5,500 mdv: 6,000	Elk
Lake View Landfill	adv: 4,600 mdv: 5,000	Erie
McKean County Landfill	adv: 6,000 mdv: 6,000	McKean
Northwest Sanitary Landfill	adv: 2,500 mdv: 2,500	Butler
Seneca Landfill	adv: 3,000 mdv: 3,000	Butler

== Recycling in Pennsylvania ==
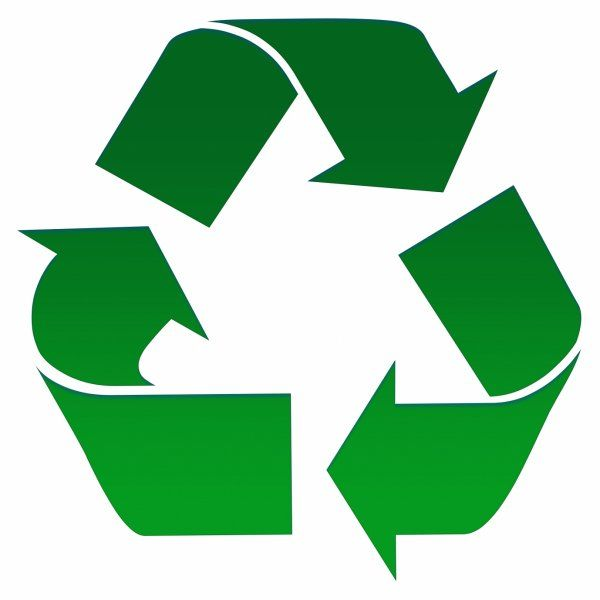

One way to reduce the amount of waste going to the Pennsylvania landfills is to have a recycling campaign. Recycling statewide began with the instatement of the Municipal Waste Planning Recycling and Waste Reduction Act, also known as Act 101 in July 1988. Act 101 at this time had four major goals:

1. Recycle 25 percent of PA's solid waste stream by January 1997
2. Reduce waste going to landfills
3. Increase the use of products that are recyclable or made from recycled material
4. Educate each person in the commonwealth as to the value of recycling and waste reduction

These plans were going to be implemented throughout several phases within each municipality over the following years. A county's responsibilities were to manage the municipalities recycling efforts. In efforts to manage the municipalities the county would have to have a solid waste plan in place by March 1991, which would be revised every 3 years, and to submit annual reports to the state based on the efforts of each municipality's recycling efforts. These annual reports would then be combined to create a statewide report of its recycling efforts and the benefits gained by doing so. This act was funded by the Recycling Fund which created a $2-per-ton fee on all waste entering the landfills known as the recycling fee. In addition to the Recycling Fund they also received other grants such as the household hazardous Waste Collection and Disposal Grants, Host Municipality Inspector Grants, and Independent Permit Application Review Grants.

Act 101 in its essence is still in place today for all municipalities and has only been revised twice to help strengthen and grow the program. The most recent change to Act 101 happened in May 2010 which is the extension of the collection of the recycling fee of $2-per-ton to 2020. Other changes to Act 101 are Act 140 which established requirement for the spending of grants over 10,000 given to communities by Act 101. Act 140 also gave municipalities requirements such as:

- "All residents must be required by ordinance to have waste and recycling services
- Must have an implemented residential curbside recycling program
- Must facilitate a commercial recycling program
- Must provide semi-annual residential and commercial recycling education
- Enforcement program
- Special Materials Program- for the collection of special waste such as tires, white goods, HHW, etc. Must have provision for or participate in county, multi-municipal, or private sector collection efforts
- Anti-Littering Program-through practice and/or education; sponsor, facilitate, or support programs that address anti-littering and illegal dumping
- Recycling Coordinator-just have a designated person or entity responsible for recycling data collection and reporting"

The results of these acts include:

- In 2014, Pennsylvania recycled over 16.84 million tons of resources with benefits of having 15.88 million tons of carbon dioxide emissions removed from the air.
- In 2013, Pennsylvania recycled over 6.12 million tons of resources with benefits of having 7.5 million tons of carbon dioxide emissions from the air.
- In 2012, Pennsylvania recycled over 8.5 million tons of resources.

== EcoTourism in Pennsylvania ==
Pennsylvania's beautiful landscapes can be seen through its many national parks. In fact, Pennsylvania has 19 National Parks throughout the state. However, Pennsylvania has an additional 9 park sites that are either affiliated or managed by the National Park Service. This allows for a number of different avenues to bring in revenue throughout the parks within Pennsylvania that receive 9,935,361 individuals visiting them each year. These visitors create an overall economic benefit of $453,100,000 from tourism at these sites. This economic benefit can be the result of entrance fees, food purchases, and souvenirs. Below is a table of the 19 National State Parks in Pennsylvania and their yearly operation costs and personal costs from the 2017 fiscal year. These operating costs are what are deducted from the parks revenue to find the total profit of each park. These operations costs include things such as maintenance of the parks and wages for park workers. The yearly personal costs are the costs of entrance for the parks. In addition, the table includes the yearly visitation of the parks to show the number of visitors that went through during the 2014 year. To begin to see a portion of the revenue made by these parks is the revenue made by entrance fees. To find this portion of the revenue, multiply the yearly visitation and the yearly personal costs. This will result in only one small portion of the yearly revenue that these parks produce.

National State Parks in PA	Location in PA	Yearly operation costs (hundreds)	Yearly visitation	Yearly personal costs	Image
Allegheny Portage Railroad National Historic Site	Gallitzin, PA	2,115	148,280	Free to Public	
Appalachian National Scenic Trail (Appalachian Trail)	Pen Mar, PA to Delaware Water Gap	1,586	N/A	Free to Public	
Chesapeake Bay Gateways Network	Towanda, PA to York, PA	9,577	4,925,582	Free to Public	
Delaware Water Gap National Recreation Area	Bushkill, PA *	9,832	4,314,085	Cars: $7.00 Bikes: $1.00 Walking: $1.00	
Edgar Allan Poe National Historic Site	Philadelphia, PA	397	13,128	Free to Public	
Eisenhower National Historic Site	Gettysburg, PA	1,123	54,668	Kids: $5.00 Adults: $7.50	
First State National Historical Park	Chaddsford, PA	717	N/A	Free to Public	
Flight 93 National Memorial	Schanksville, PA	1,588	262,441	Free to Public	
Fort Necessity National Battlefield	Farmington, PA	1,615	199,837	Free to Public	
Friendship Hill National Historic Site	Point Marion, PA	579	32,864	Free to Public	
Gettysburg National Military Park	Gettysburg, PA	7,004	1,003,581	Free to Public	
Hopewell Furnace National Historic Site	Elverson, PA	1,437	44,929	Free to Public	
Independence National Historical Park	Philadelphia, PA	23, 876	3,552,672	Free to Public	
Johnstown Flood National Memorial	South Fork, PA	821	139,603	Free to Public	
Potomac Heritage National Scenic Trail	Dunbar, PA	406	N/A	Free to Public	
Steamtown National Historic Site	Scranton, PA	5,709	81,802	Entrance Fee: $7.00 Train Ride: $5.00	
Thaddeus Kosciuszko National Memorial	Philadelphia, PA	166	1,608	Free to Public	
Upper Delaware Scenic and Recreational River	Pike and Wayne, PA	N/A	228,284	Free to Public	
Valley Forge National Historic Park	Valley Forge, PA	6,396	1,897,029	Free to Public	

Since the affiliated and parks managed by the National Park Service do not have use the National Park Service's budget therefore they were not reported in the budget justification of the 2017 fiscal year. Hence, we do not have their operation costs, but we do still have the yearly personal costs.

Affiliated or Managed by National Park Service within PA	Location in PA	Yearly personal costs	Image
Captain John Smith Chesapeake National Historic Trail	Lancaster, PA	Free to Public	
Delaware and Lehigh National Heritage Corridor	Easton, PA	Free to Public	
Gloria Dei Church National Historic Site	Philadelphia, PA	Free to Public	
Lower Delaware National Wild and Scenic River	Philadelphia, PA	Free to Public	
North Country National Scenic Trail	Baker, PA	Free to Public	
Oil Region National Heritage Area	Oil City, PA	Free to Public	
Rivers of Steel National Heritage Area	Homestead, PA	Free to Members $1 for Kids $3 for Adults	
Schuylkill River Valley	Pottstown, PA	Free to Public	
Washington-Rochambeau Revolutionary Route National Historic Trail	Philadelphia, PA	Free to Public	
