= Western Pennsylvania =

Region of Pennsylvania, United States

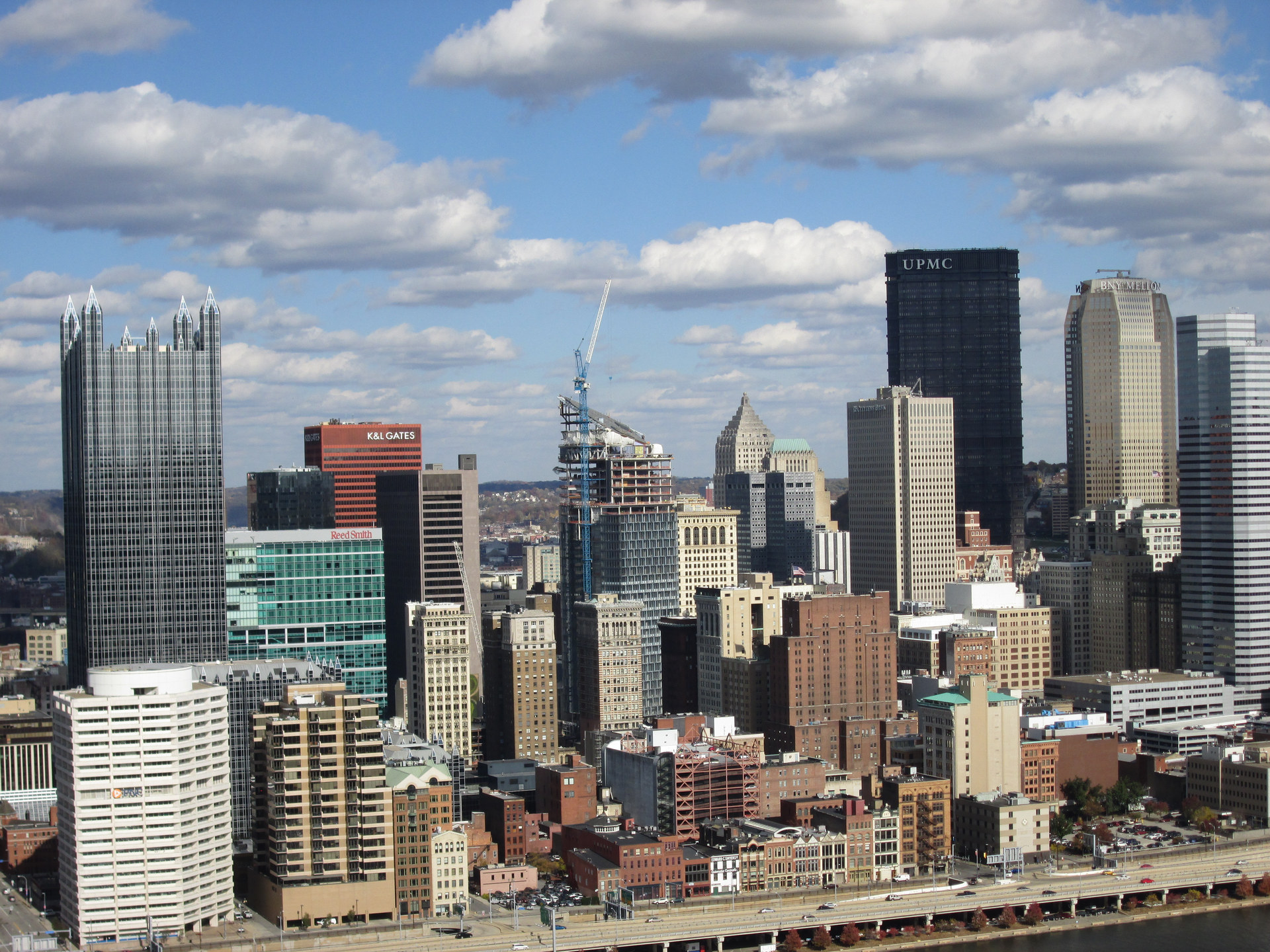
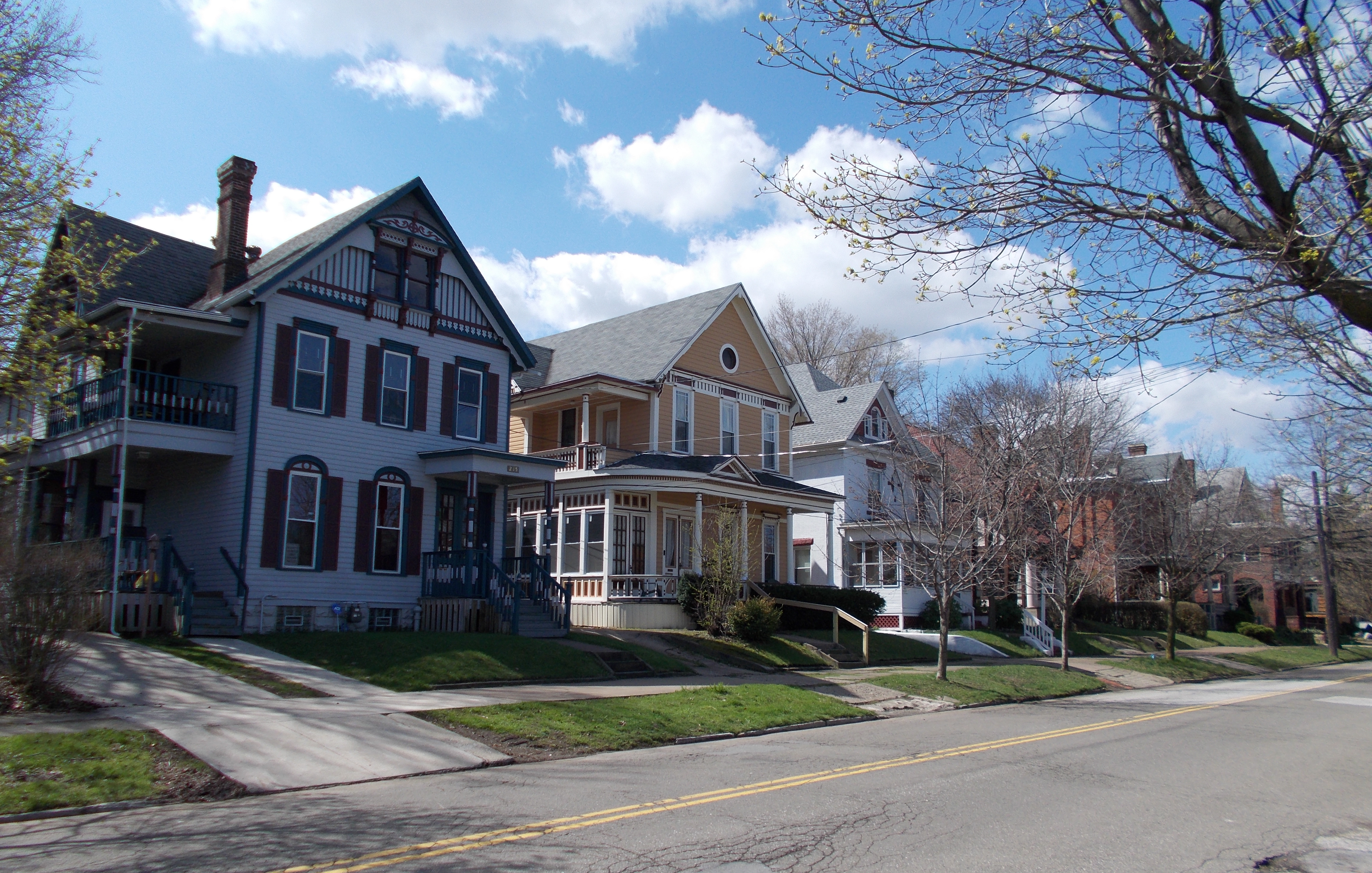
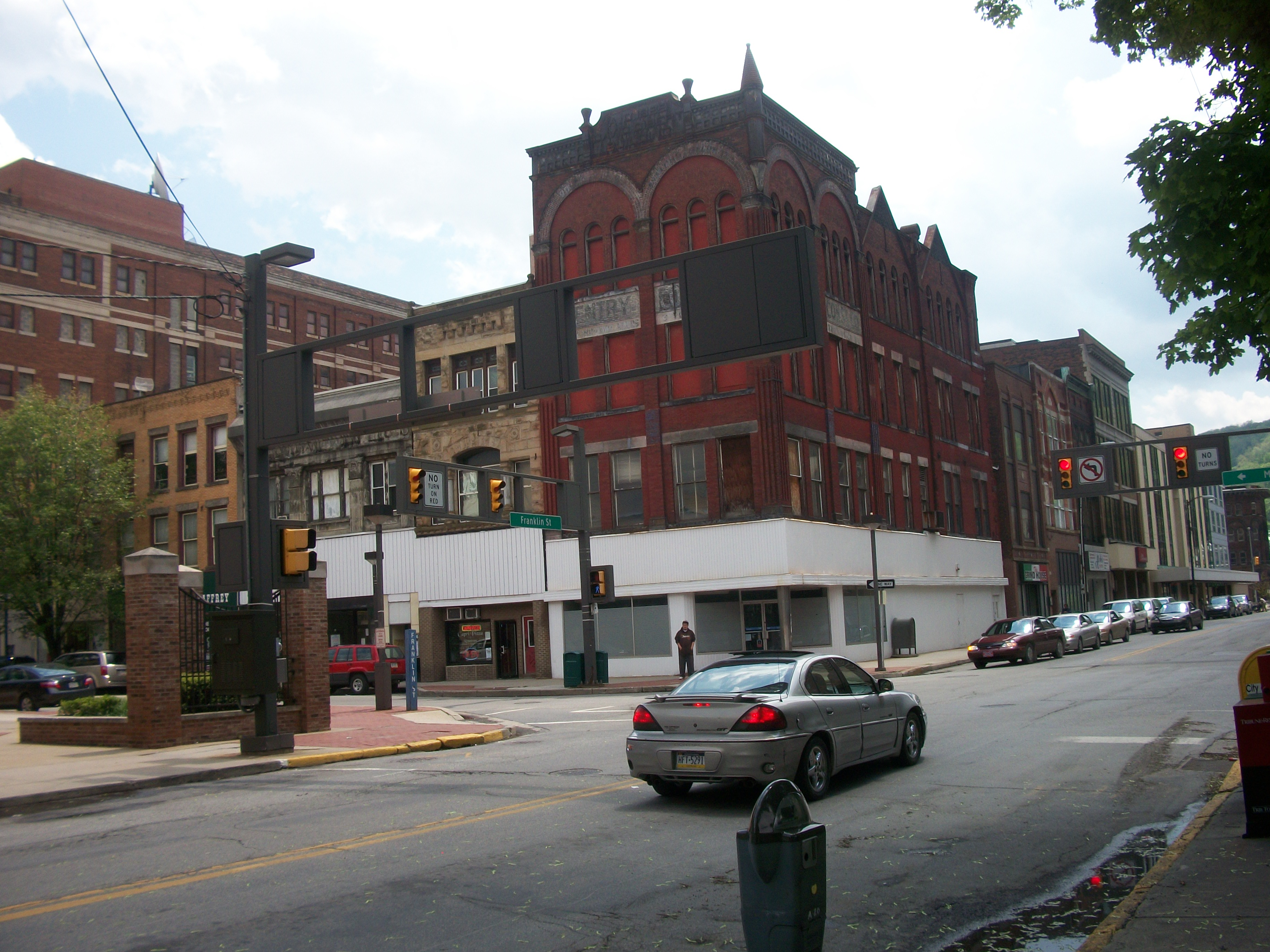
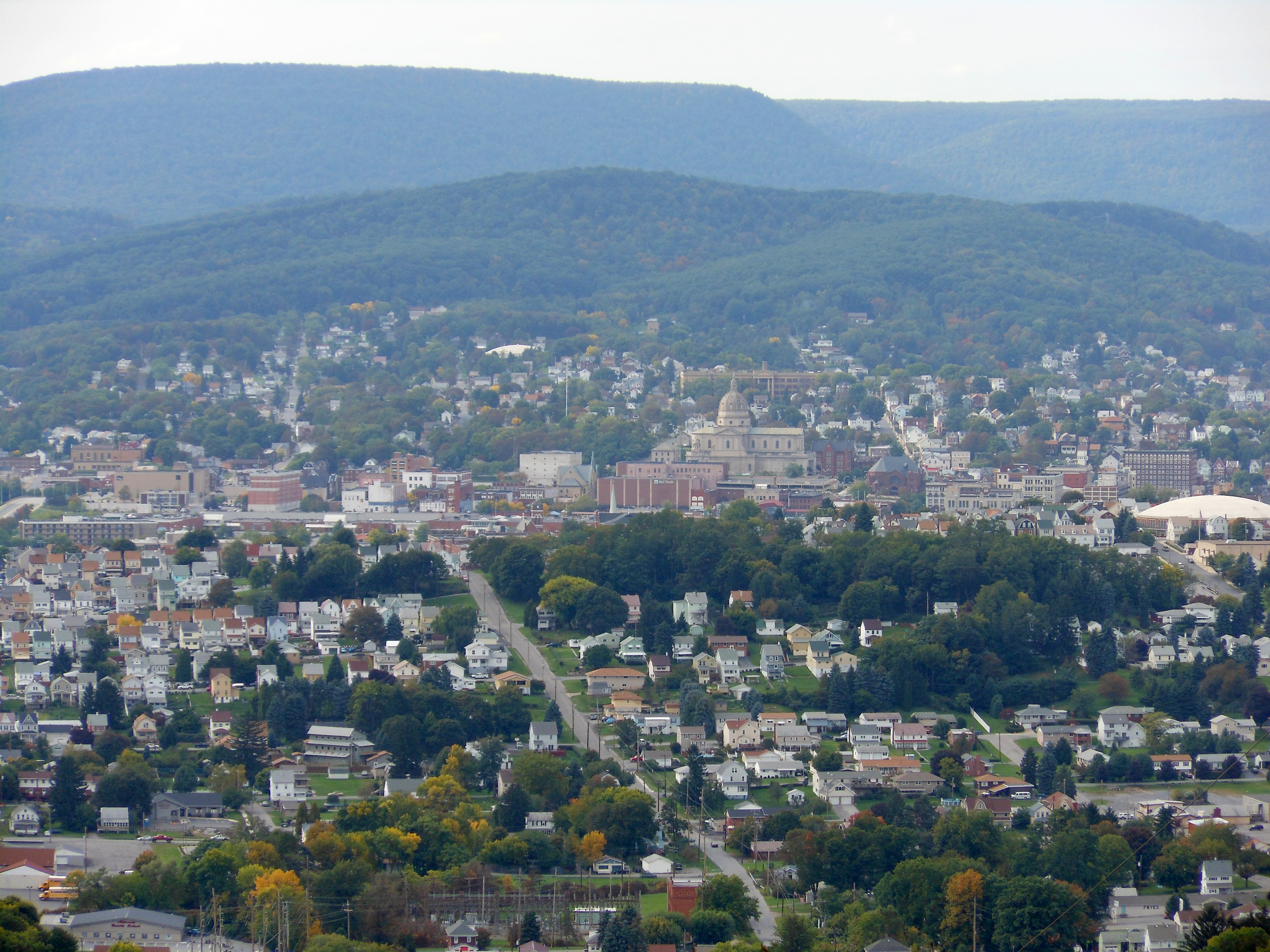
- Clockwise from top left: Pittsburgh, Erie, Altoona, and Johnstown

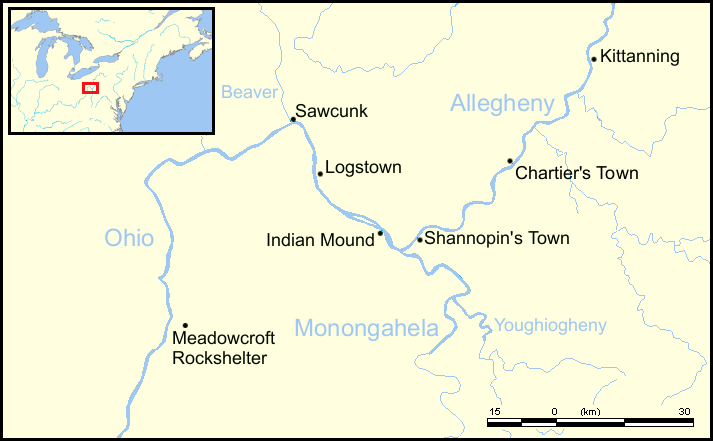
- Indigenous American villages were located throughout Western Pennsylvania. Kittanning still uses its Indigenous name, while the town of Sawcunk lies on the site of present-day Rochester, Pennsylvania.
- Coordinates: 41.05°N 79.05°W
- Country: United States
- Commonwealth: Pennsylvania
- Largest city: Pittsburgh
- Other cities: List: In Region: Altoona; Bradford; DuBois; Erie; Franklin; Butler; Connellsville; Washington; Uniontown; New Castle; Johnstown; Oil City; Sharon

Area
  - Total: 20,363 sq mi (52,740 km^{2})
  - Land: 19,412 sq mi (50,280 km^{2})
  - Water: 951 sq mi (2,460 km^{2}) 4.67%

Population (2020 Census)
  - Total: 3,753,944
  - Density: 193.38/sq mi (74.66/km^{2})
- Time zone: UTC-5 (ET)
  - Summer (DST): UTC-4 (EDT)

Western Pennsylvania is a region in the Commonwealth of Pennsylvania encompassing approximately the western half of the state. Pittsburgh is the region's principal city, with a metropolitan area population of about 2.4 million people, and serves as its economic and cultural center. Erie, Altoona, and Johnstown are its other metropolitan centers. As of the 2020 census, Western Pennsylvania had a population of 3,753,944.

Although the Commonwealth does not designate Western Pennsylvania as an official region of the state, it has retained a distinct identity since the colonial-era Province of Pennsylvania because of its geographical distance from Philadelphia, the state's first settlement, and because of its topographical separation from eastern Pennsylvania, including the Appalachian Mountains, which characterizes the region. The strong cultural identity of Western Pennsylvania is reinforced by the state supreme court, which convenes in Pittsburgh in addition to Harrisburg and Philadelphia.

== Counties ==
Since at least the early twentieth century, scholarly books such as Guidebook to Historic Western Pennsylvania, published by the University of Pittsburgh Press (1938), formally define the region as the twenty-six counties west of the Appalachian Divide, a meridian from the north at McKean County down and along its eastern border and ending in the south at Bedford County.

In alphabetical order those counties are:

- Allegheny
- Armstrong
- Beaver
- Bedford
- Blair
- Butler
- Cambria
- Cameron
- Clarion
- Clearfield
- Crawford
- Elk
- Erie
- Fayette
- Forest
- Greene
- Indiana
- Jefferson
- Lawrence
- McKean
- Mercer
- Somerset
- Venango
- Warren
- Washington
- Westmoreland

== Description ==
Long recognized as a powerhouse of American industry, Western Pennsylvania is a large geophysical and socio-economic entity. It encompasses that portion of the state to the west of the Appalachian divide and included within the Mississippi drainage system of rivers.

The largest rivers in this area are the Allegheny River, which flows southward from the New York border, and the Monongahela River, which flows northward from West Virginia. Both rivers meet in Downtown Pittsburgh and join to form the Ohio River, which from that point flows an additional 981 miles (1,579 km) southwest to the Mississippi River. The juncture of the Allegheny and Monongahela was historically regarded as strategic and the gateway to the interior of the continent from the east. At various times this juncture has been called the Forks of the Ohio, Fort Duquesne, Fort Pitt, the Golden Triangle, and today, at its apex, Point State Park. After several decades of border war and 150 years of high-rent city-center urbanization, the original 1764 blockhouse from Fort Pitt still stands here and is one of the oldest buildings in the region.

Other notable rivers are the Youghiogheny River, flowing north from West Virginia and western Maryland to join the Monongahela just upriver of Pittsburgh, and which was the early route of penetration into Western Pennsylvania, the Kiskiminetas River, French Creek, a major passageway between Lake Erie and the Allegheny River for the Indians and early French explorers and traders, and the small Oil Creek in Crawford and Venango counties, where slicks gave an indication of petroleum reserves and in whose watershed the first oil well in the United States was drilled.

The highest point in Pennsylvania, Mount Davis, reaches 3,213 feet (979 m), and is located near the southern border of the state in Somerset County, approximately 100 miles (160 km) east of the southwestern corner, where the Appalachian Mountains enter Pennsylvania from the south. To the west and north of this point lies the Allegheny Plateau, a dissected plateau so eroded that it appears to be an interminable series of high hills and steep valleys. The peaks in the area are among the lowest in the East Coast highlands, but what they lack in height they make up in wide extent of land covered, which forms a vast formidable barrier for mile upon mile to overland travel from the coast.

=== Northwestern Pennsylvania ===
Erie is the business center and cultural hub of Northwestern Pennsylvania. The compiled population of the region was estimated to be 938,516 in 2015. Although the only county with population growth was Butler, the deficit for all other counties was within 3%. The region also includes the Erie-Meadville, PA Combined Statistical Area.

Northwestern Pennsylvania is home to the Allegheny National Forest, and is the heart of Pennsylvania's oil and gas economy.

== Education ==
Western Pennsylvania is home to more than two dozen institutions of higher learning, including those listed below. (Seminaries are not listed)

- Allegheny College
- The Art Institute of Pittsburgh
- Community College of Allegheny County (several campuses)
- Community College of Beaver County
- Butler County Community College (several campuses)
- California University of Pennsylvania
- Carlow University
- Carnegie Mellon University
- Chatham University
- Clarion University of Pennsylvania
- Duquesne University
- Edinboro University of Pennsylvania
- Gannon University
- Geneva College
- Grove City College
- Indiana University of Pennsylvania (several branch campuses)
- LaRoche College
- Lake Erie College of Osteopathic Medicine
- Mercyhurst University
- Mount Aloysius College
- Penn Highlands Community College
- Pennsylvania State University (several branch campuses)
- Point Park University
- Robert Morris University
- Saint Francis University
- Saint Vincent College
- Seton Hill University
- Slippery Rock University of Pennsylvania
- Thiel College
- University of Pittsburgh (several campuses)
- Vincentian Academy
- Washington and Jefferson College
- Waynesburg University
- Westminster College
- Westmoreland County Community College

== Distinctiveness ==
Western Pennsylvania is distinctive from the rest of the state by several important and complex factors:

- The initial difficulty of transportation access from the east involved many miles of parallel ridges of the Appalachian Mountains, and then the broken hills and valleys of the Allegheny Plateau, all of which were covered in thick forests. The initial method of access from areas east of the Appalachians was to travel southbound outside of Pennsylvania, then follow the Potomac River northwest through Maryland and Virginia and reenter Pennsylvania in the state's southwest corner. Various methods of more direct transport were later tried, including a canal system westbound over the mountains and then, later, the Pennsylvania Railroad, which extended the railroad systems of the East Coast west to Pittsburgh and the Ohio Valley. One of the best known transportation innovations, which expanded access to Western Pennsylvania, is the Pennsylvania Turnpike, which was the first modern limited access highway in North America.
- The initial challenge confronting Western Pennsylvania was economic marketing of a limited number of goods that could stand such high freight costs. The insensitivity of the new U.S. federal government to the marketing problems in the west ultimately led to the Whiskey Rebellion in Western Pennsylvania, an event that seriously challenged the political viability of the United States after its successful establishment following the American Revolutionary War. Later efforts to access the region included promoting access to it via the Ohio River, with Pittsburgh a barge and steamboat center of the mid-continent. In the 21st century, Pittsburgh is still strongly centered around its rivers; the port of Pittsburgh ranks 13th by tonnage transport in the nation, surpassing even the Port of Philadelphia in tonnage because of the heavy shipping of bulk coal by barge inland on the rivers. Locally, a system of agriculture arose suitable to Western Pennsylvania's rugged terrain, emphasizing animal husbandry and dairying but with few exportable vegetable crops. The search for some sort of exportable agricultural specialty perhaps also encouraged the rise of the sauce industry and its first location at Sharpsburg in what was later to become the large Heinz company.
- The search for exploitable resources first resulted with the development of huge bituminous coal deposits in the area for use in a growing iron foundry sector. Industrialist Andrew Carnegie later led a large steel manufacturer in the region, which became known for its industrial manufacturing. The region also had large glass, pottery, brickmaking, and ceramic industries, which took advantage of the coal and the sand and clay in local soils. The local glass industry produced 45 percent of the nation's output in glass by the 1860s and more than 80 percent of the output by the 1920s.
- Other exploitable resources in Western Pennsylvania included the first oil well in the world in Titusville and the rise of the US petroleum industry. Another was widespread deforestation of the outlying areas and their subsequent reforestation under Gifford Pinchot, who instituted the first large scale government sponsored timber management effort in the U.S.. During this time of intensive exploitation of forests a whole new sector, the wood chemistry industry, appeared and then later vanished. The forested areas of the region include a large animal population, which is the basis for supports the famous "Pennsylvania deer-hunting" cultural ethos. The first day of deer-hunting season is a de facto unofficial holiday in much of the central and northern regions of the state, and absence from work or school is generally tolerated with no explanation necessary.
- Since the early 1950s, a renaissance occurred in the development of cultural institutions and abatement of pollution in Pittsburgh and its surrounding area. The effects of this increase in livability are particularly apparent in the Golden Triangle district of Downtown Pittsburgh, which at one point had been plagued with so much industrial haze that drivers used their headlights in mid-day. However, that social improvement has not always been accompanied by a serious plan of regional economic development to assess what, precisely, should fill the income void after the departure of steel. In addition, the city of Pittsburgh continues to become depopulated and has recently been put under state supervision of its finances.
- Culturally, the distinctiveness of Western Pennsylvania is underlined by the existence of a unique local dialect called "Pittsburghese" or Pittsburgh English, sometimes affectionately termed the "yinzer" dialect from its use of the term "yins" (also spelled "yunz, "yinz", "youns", etc.) as the plural form of "you". This is probably a legacy of Ulster-Scots settlement in the area. Western Pennsylvanians also refer to soft drinks as "pop" while in the eastern half of the state it is referred to as "soda."
- The Erie Triangle and the city of Erie give Pennsylvania a port along the Great Lakes. This region is unique within western Pennsylvania in that it maintains stronger geographic and cultural connections with western New York than it does with western Pennsylvania, due in large part to its identification with the eastern Great Lakes region, rather than Appalachia. This is reflected in the city and county of Erie sharing far more similarities with Buffalo and southwestern New York than it does with Pittsburgh and western Pennsylvania. The Erie region is also known for its distinct agriculture, centered on grapes and other fruit, because of the moderating climatic influence, in both summer and fall, of Lake Erie. (In winter, the area is often inundated with "lake-effect" snow.) There are also small commercial fresh-water fisheries and many streams and smaller lakes with a variety of fish to catch, including yellow perch and walleye.
- In Stonycreek Township is the memorial and crash site of United Airlines Flight 93, the "Let's Roll" flight that occurred on 9/11 in 2001 after passengers attempted to overpower the plane's hijackers. The site is an informal patriotic shrine with many hand-made mementos voluntarily gracing the area. There is a movement to add the site to the National Park System. It is a startling coincidence that the Stonycreek site is comparatively close to the other centuries-earlier locations of military engagements in Western Pennsylvania, such as Fort Duquesne and the area of the Whiskey Rebellion. These locations were on a strategic route from eastern settlements in Pennsylvania to the south and west in Virginia, and later Washington, D.C.

== Sports ==
Pittsburgh boasts three major league sports teams: the Pittsburgh Steelers of the National Football League, the Pittsburgh Pirates of Major League Baseball, and the Pittsburgh Penguins of the National Hockey League. Pittsburgh is also home to the Pittsburgh Riverhounds of the USL Championship. The Pittsburgh Panthers, the NCAA Division I of the University of Pittsburgh, is the region's primary collegiate athletic program. Erie and Johnstown have junior ice hockey teams, including the Erie Otters, who play in the Ontario Hockey League, and the Johnstown Tomahawks, who play in the North American Hockey League. There is also an independent pro baseball team in Washington, the Washington Wild Things, who play in the Frontier League, a partner league of Major League Baseball. The area is famous for having many football stars come from the area, including Mike Ditka, Terry Bradshaw, Joe Namath, and Johnny Unitas.

== See also ==
- List of Appalachian Regional Commission counties#Pennsylvania
- Northwestern Pennsylvania
- Pittsburgh metropolitan area
- Western Pennsylvania Conservancy
