= Oil Creek Township, Venango County, Pennsylvania =

Township in Pennsylvania, US

Coordinates: 41.5845°N 79.6112°W

- Township
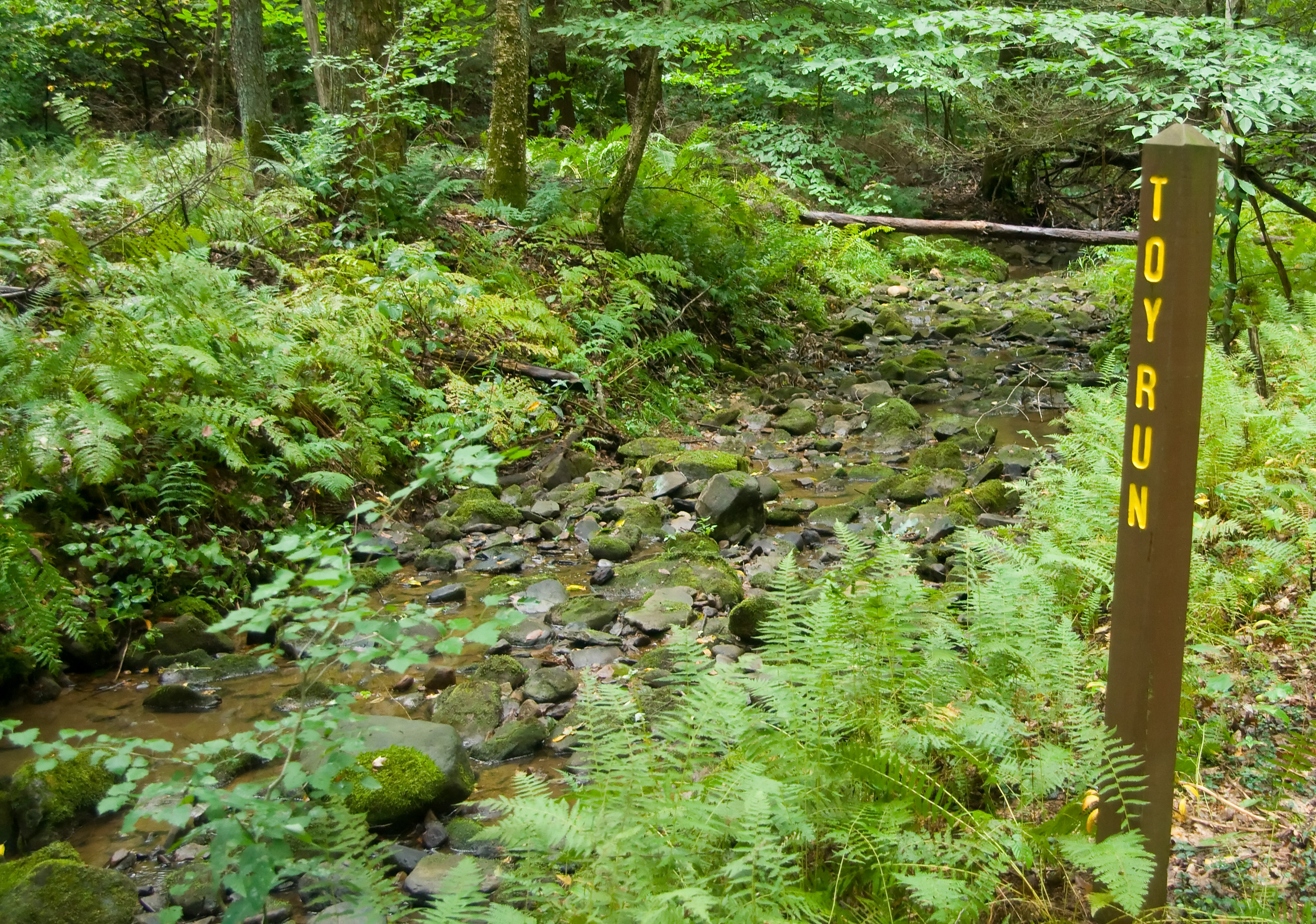
- Toy Run in Oil Creek State Park

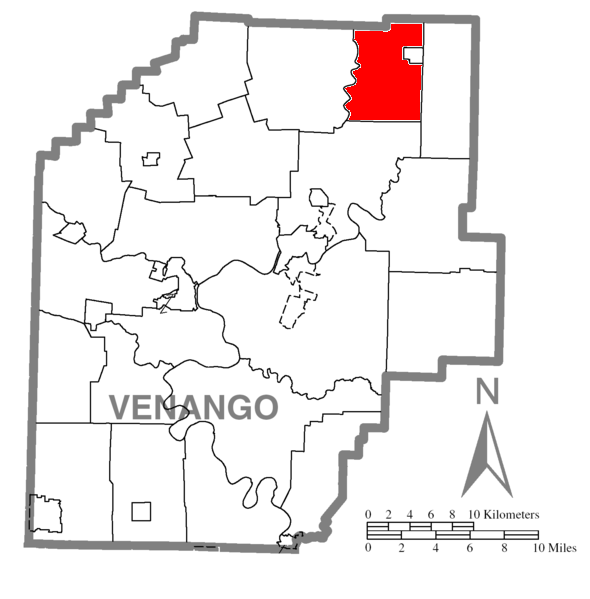
- Map of Venango County, Pennsylvania highlighting Oilcreek Township

- Map of Venango County, Pennsylvania
- Country: United States
- State: Pennsylvania
- County: Venango
- Settled: 1796
- Incorporated: 1866

Government
  - Type: Board of Supervisors

Area
  - Total: 23.03 sq mi (59.64 km^{2})
  - Land: 23.03 sq mi (59.64 km^{2})
  - Water: 0 sq mi (0.00 km^{2})

Population (2020)
  - Total: 752 ▼
  - Estimate (2024): 731
  - Density: 35.5/sq mi (13.72/km^{2})
- Time zone: UTC-5 (Eastern (EST))
  - Summer (DST): UTC-4 (EDT)
- Area code: 814
- FIPS code: 42-121-56480

Oil Creek Township is a township in Venango County, Pennsylvania, United States. The population was 752 at the 2020 census, a decrease from 854 in 2010, which was an increase over the 840 residents tabulated as of the 2000 census.

== Geography ==
According to the United States Census Bureau, the township has a total area of 23.0 square miles (59.5 km^{2}), all land.

== Demographics ==
Historical population
Census	Pop.	Note	%±
2000	840		—
2010	854		1.7%
2020	752		−11.9%
2024 (est.)	731		−2.8%
U.S. Decennial Census

As of the census of 2000, there were 840 people, 328 households, and 253 families residing in the township. The population density was 36.6 inhabitants per square mile (14.1/km^{2}). There were 389 housing units at an average density of 16.9/sq mi (6.5/km^{2}). The racial makeup of the township was 99.29% White, 0.12% African American, 0.12% Asian, and 0.48% from two or more races. Hispanic or Latino of any race were 0.36% of the population.

There were 328 households, out of which 29.6% had children under the age of 18 living with them, 68.0% were married couples living together, 7.3% had a female householder with no husband present, and 22.6% were non-families. 18.9% of all households were made up of individuals, and 10.1% had someone living alone who was 65 years of age or older. The average household size was 2.56 and the average family size was 2.91.

In the township the population was spread out, with 21.8% under the age of 18, 6.3% from 18 to 24, 26.4% from 25 to 44, 31.5% from 45 to 64, and 13.9% who were 65 years of age or older. The median age was 43 years. For every 100 females there were 111.6 males. For every 100 females age 18 and over, there were 112.6 males.

The median income for a household in the township was $34,107, and the median income for a family was $41,442. Males had a median income of $31,094 versus $22,188 for females. The per capita income for the township was $16,166. About 8.2% of families and 9.1% of the population were below the poverty line, including 10.9% of those under age 18 and 11.4% of those age 65 or over.
