= Drake Well Museum =

Drake Well Museum and Park

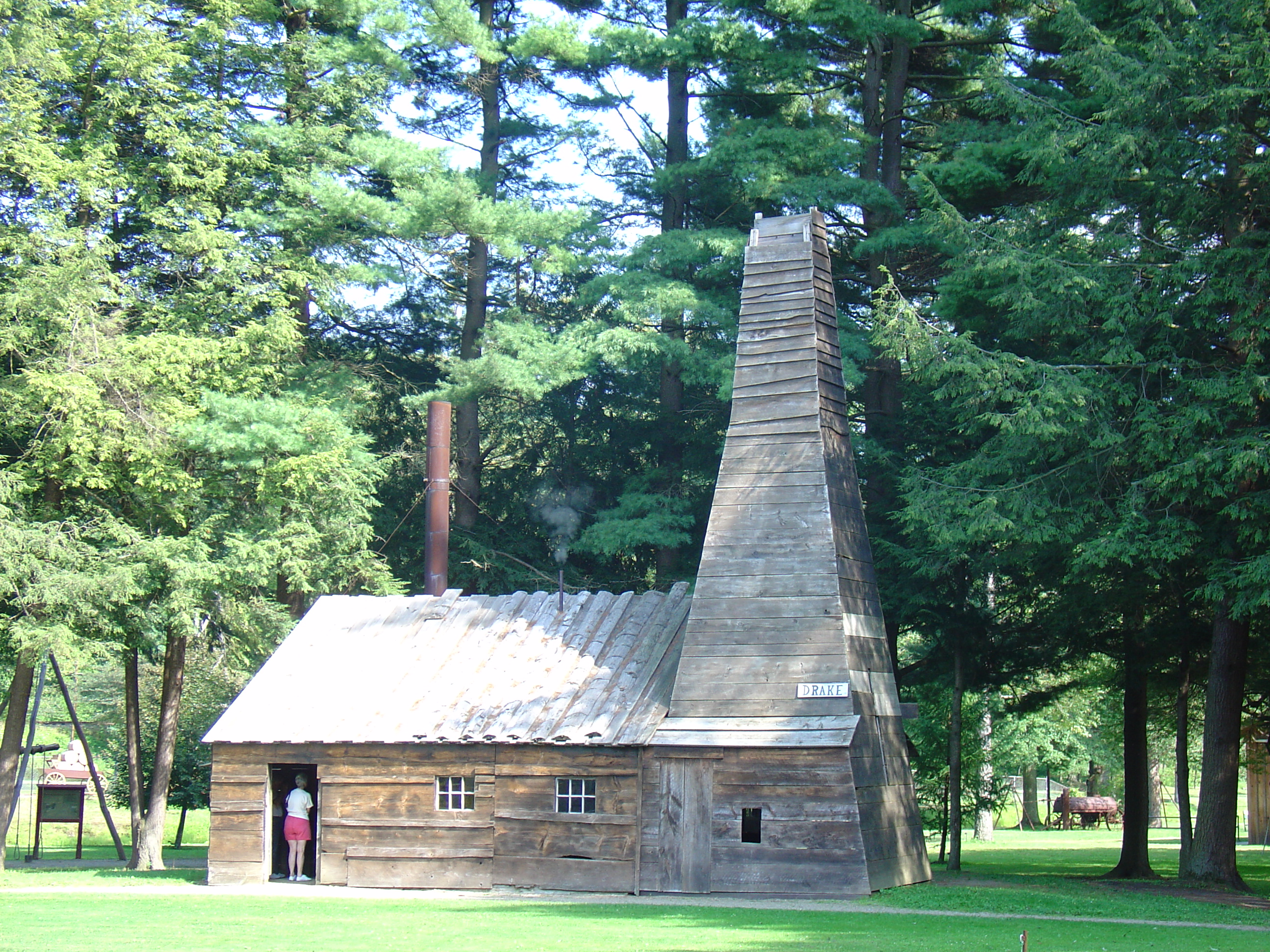
- Replica Drake Well engine house and derrick
- Established: 1934
- Location: 202 Museum Lane, Titusville, Pennsylvania, U.S.
- Coordinates: 41°36′40.4″N 79°39′26.7″W
- Type: Industry museum
- Collection size: 4000+
- Visitors: 7,352 (2021)
- Director: Michael Knecht
- Curator: Sarah Bell
- Website: drakewell.org

The Drake Well Museum and Park is a museum in Cherrytree Township, Pennsylvania that chronicles the birth of the American oil industry in 1859 by Colonel Edwin Drake. The museum collects and preserves related artifacts. The reconstructed Drake Well demonstrates the first practical use of salt drilling techniques for the extraction of petroleum through an oil well.

A historic site, the museum is located in Cherrytree Township, 3 miles (4.8 km) south of Titusville on Drake Well Road, situated between Pennsylvania Routes 8 and 27. The museum is accredited by the American Alliance of Museums.

== Facilities and features ==
The site features a reconstruction of the oil well drilled by Colonel Edwin Drake and working oil field equipment. The museum includes indoor and outdoor exhibits and houses a library of over 2,500 titles, over 1,000 cubic feet (28 m^{3}) of manuscript material and a photographic collection with over 10,800 images. Programs include the Fall Gas-Up engine show, a spring Heritage Lecture Series, Heritage School Tours, and the Nitroglycerine Show. Visitor services include orientation film, guided tours, a museum store and more.

Nearby attractions are Oil Creek State Park and the Oil Creek and Titusville Railroad.

The State of Pennsylvania has spent US $8 million for renovation of the museum. The new permanent exhibit "There's a Drop of Oil and Gas in Your Life Everyday" features over 530 artifacts, many historic images and stories about the birth and growth of the oil and gas industries. Interactive exhibits include a discussion between John D. Rockefeller and Ida Tarbell, author of The History of Standard Oil.

== Administration ==
Drake Well Museum and Park is administered by the Pennsylvania Historical and Museum Commission (PHMC) and the Friends of Drake Well, Inc. It was formerly a Pennsylvania state park, but was transferred to the PHMC.

== Exhibits ==
- The Central Power Lease was used to pump several wells at the same time with one engine. A 20 horsepower (15 kW), Olin hit-and-miss engine turns an eccentric gear connected to many rod lines. The rod lines could be routed over or under roads to reach the wells. A "barker" on the engine exhaust pipe gives it a distinctive sound that would allow the operators of the engine to tell it was still running, from a distance. Powered by natural gas, the engine is in operation daily from May to October.

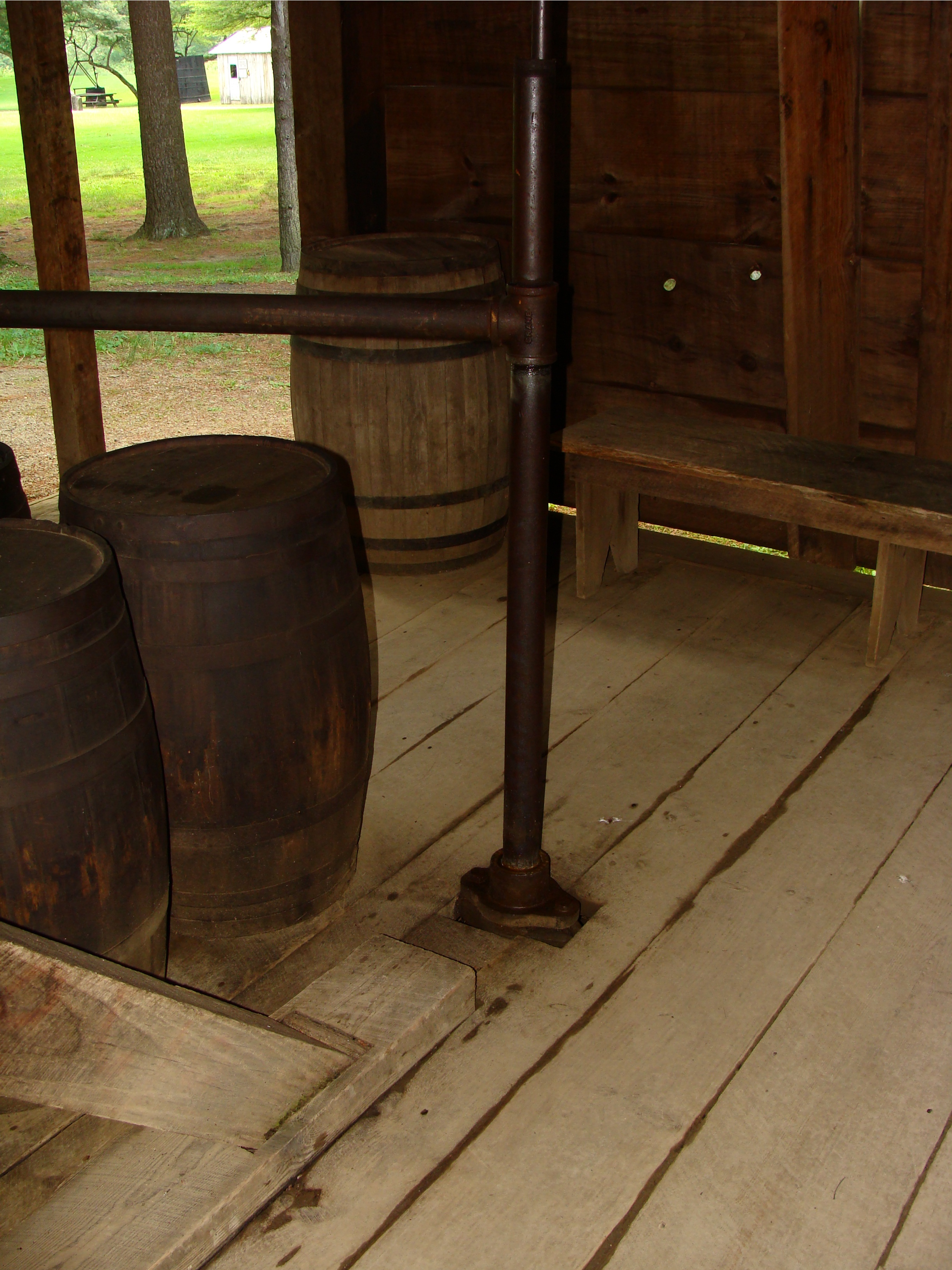
View of well (drivepipe) from the interior of the engine house

- Built in 1945, the Drake Well replica is a "board-for-board" reconstruction of the engine house and derrick as it looked in the 1860s. The original building was destroyed by fire in October 1859 and was replaced a month later. The museum used photographs taken by John A. Mather to exactly duplicate the structure. A working, reproduction steam engine was acquired in 1986. The engine pumps recirculated petroleum from the well from May to October. The petroleum used at Drake Well is originally from McClintock Well #1 near Rouseville, the oldest oil well still in operation.
- The Silver Run Pump Station was built in 1894 by the National Transit Company, a company created to manage pipelines for Standard Oil. The station remained in operation in Franklin until 1968 and was donated to the museum by Pennzoil in 1981.
- The Visitor Center contains an orientation film, the new permanent exhibit "There's a Drop of Oil and Gas in Your Life Everyday" and a research library. The center also has the Amoskeag steam pumper Colonel Drake (1868) from Titusville and the photographic process wagon like what Mather used on display. The new exhibit also features many more artifacts including John Wilkes Booth's cane.

== History ==
=== Development of oil drilling ===
Oil was known to exist in the Oil Creek Valley of northwestern Pennsylvania, but there was no practical way to extract it. Its main use to that time had been as a medicine for animals, humans and the early development of kerosene. In the late 1850s Seneca Oil Company (formerly the Pennsylvania Rock Oil Company) sent its manager, Colonel Edwin L. Drake, to develop a way to produce more ‘Rock oil’ from the ‘Oil Creek’. His employer secured a piece of leased land just south of Titusville, a slow-growing and peaceful community. Lumber was the principal industry at the time, with at least 17 sawmills in the area. The land was chosen because for hundreds of years Native Americans skimmed surface oil from the water near a naturally occurring ‘Oil seep’. (Even today Oil Creek still has some natural seeps). Drake tried many ways to access and skim more oil. Eventually he attempted to dig a deep hole by hand. When a hole collapse nearly killed his men, Drake attempted drilling. He was told by local water well drillers that “You cannot drill for Rock Oil”. Drake had to travel to New Kensington, PA, (over 90 miles away), to find and hire a salt well driller, William A. Smith, in the summer of 1859. After many difficulties, they finally drilled a commercially successful well on August 27. Considered the birth of the oil industry, it was an event that changed the world.

=== Development of transportation ===
Teamsters transported the oil to barges, which were filled and sent down Oil Creek to Oil City on the Allegheny River. There the oil was transferred to steamships and sent to Pittsburgh. In 1862, transportation switched to rail with the completion of the Oil Creek and Titusville Railroad between Titusville and Corry, where freight could be transferred to other, larger, east-west rail lines. In 1865, pipelines were laid directly next to the rail line and the demand for teamsters practically ended. The next year the railroad line was extended south to Petroleum Centre and Oil City. The Union City and Titusville Railroad was built in 1865, which became part of the Philadelphia and Erie Railroad in 1871. That fall President Ulysses S. Grant visited Titusville to view the booming oil industry. The first pipeline was built in 1862 and by the late 1860s, pipelines crisscrossed the oil region.

=== Development of related business community ===
Other oil-related businesses quickly were built in the area. Eight refineries were built between 1862 and 1868 in the Titusville area alone. Drilling tools were needed and several iron works were built. Titusville grew from 250 residents to 10,000 almost overnight and in 1866 it incorporated as a city. The first oil millionaire, a resident of Titusville, was Jonathan Watson who owned the land where Drake's well was drilled. The same land is now part of Oil Creek State Park and the Drake Well Museum.

=== Fires ===
Fire was always a concern around oil and one of the worst fires was on June 11, 1880. What came to be known as "Black Friday" happened when almost 300,000 barrels (48,000 m^{3}) of oil burned after an oil tank was hit by lightning. The fire raged for three days until it finally was brought under control. Although the oil was valued at $2 million, there was no loss of life. Another fire occurred on June 5, 1892, when Oil Creek flooded and a tank of benzine overturned. The benzine ignited and in the ensuing explosions 60 men, women, and children died. Another lightning strike in 1894 resulted in 27,000 barrels (4,300 m^{3}) lost in a fire. Oil production peaked the late 1880s and has declined greatly since, although they use other oil to pump for demonstration.

== See also ==
- List of petroleum museums
- Oil Region

== Sources ==
- Sherman, John (2002). Drake Well Museum and Park. Pennsylvania Trail of History Guide. Mechanicsburg: Stackpole Books. ISBN 0-8117-2960-5.
