= Gerard Hiking Trail =

Hiking trail in Pennsylvania, United States

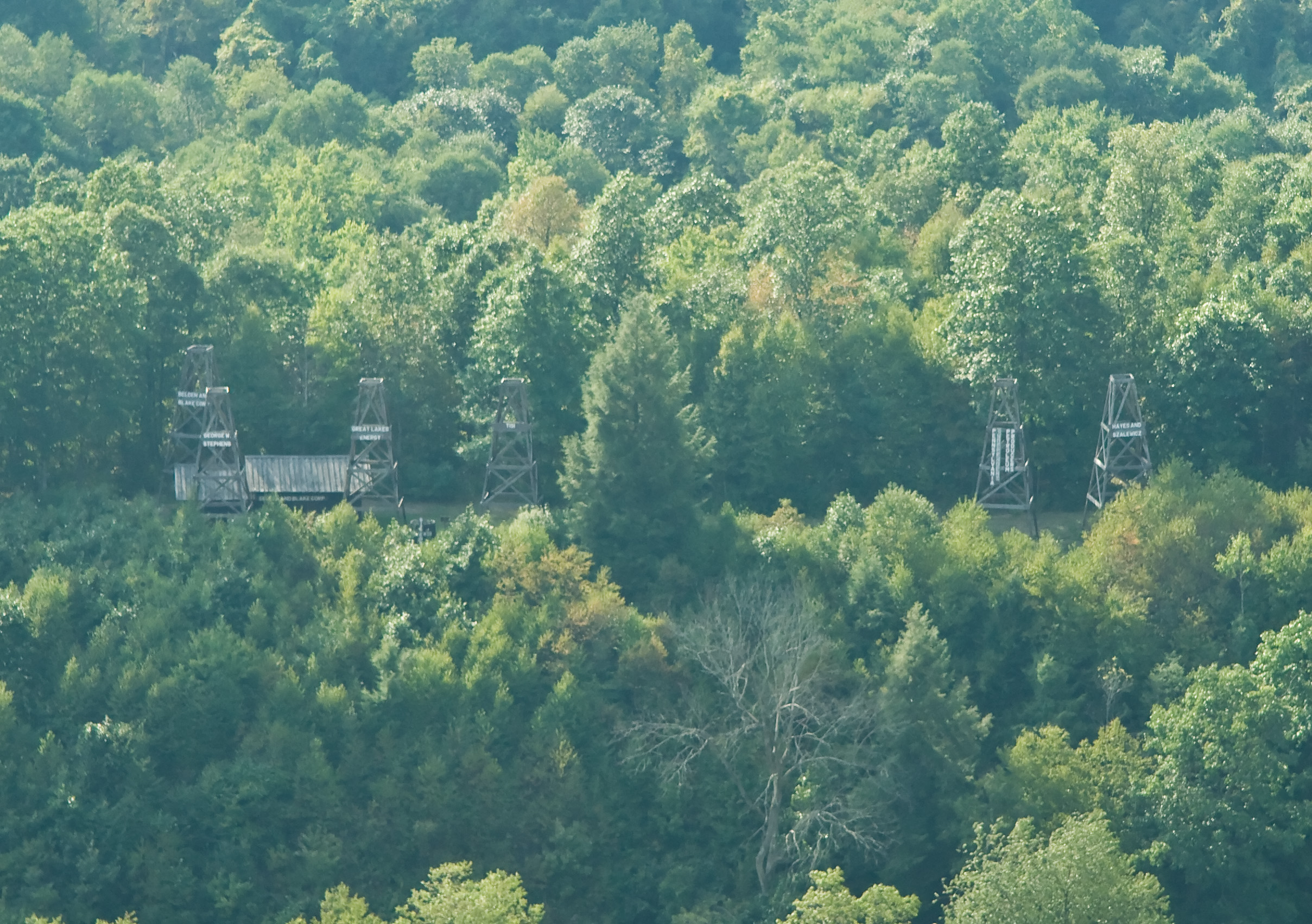
- A vista of historic structures in Oil Creek State Park, seen from the Gerard Hiking Trail.
- Length: 36 mi (58 km)
- Location: Venango County, Pennsylvania, US
- Use: Hiking
- Elevation change: Moderate
- Difficulty: Moderate
- Season: Year-round
- Hazards: Uneven and rocky terrain, rattlesnakes, mosquitoes, ticks, black bears

The Gerard Hiking Trail is an approximately 36-mile (58 km) hiking trail in Oil Creek State Park in northwestern Pennsylvania, forming a long and narrow loop on both sides of Oil Creek. Several cross-connector trails enable shorter loops of various lengths. The trail is known for numerous vistas over Oil Creek and the state park, many small waterfalls on side streams, and historic artifacts associated with early American oil exploration led by Edwin Drake, who struck oil in the area in 1859.

== History and route ==
The trail was named after state park volunteer Ray Gerard, who developed most of the trail in the 1970s. In more recent years the trail is maintained by a volunteer group of retirees from the Titusville area.

From the office at Oil Creek State Park, the Gerard Hiking Trail can be reached via a segment of the main park road and a short spur trail leading to the west. Traveling counter-clockwise, the Gerard Hiking Trail heads south and quickly reaches the top of the western side of the gorge formed by Oil Creek. The trail descends, crosses the creek on a footbridge near the state park's main entrance off of Pennsylvania Route 8, then climbs to the top of the east side of the gorge and heads north. That side of the loop features the organized Cow Run camping area.

At the northern end of the loop, the trail again descends to a crossing of Oil Creek near the state park's other entrance to the southeast of Titusville. Once again the trail ascends to the west side of the gorge and then heads to the south, where the hiker can find the organized Wolfkiel Run camping area. The loop is completed at about 36 miles at the junction with the spur trail near the state park office.
