= Oil Creek State Park =

Former oilfield in Pennsylvania

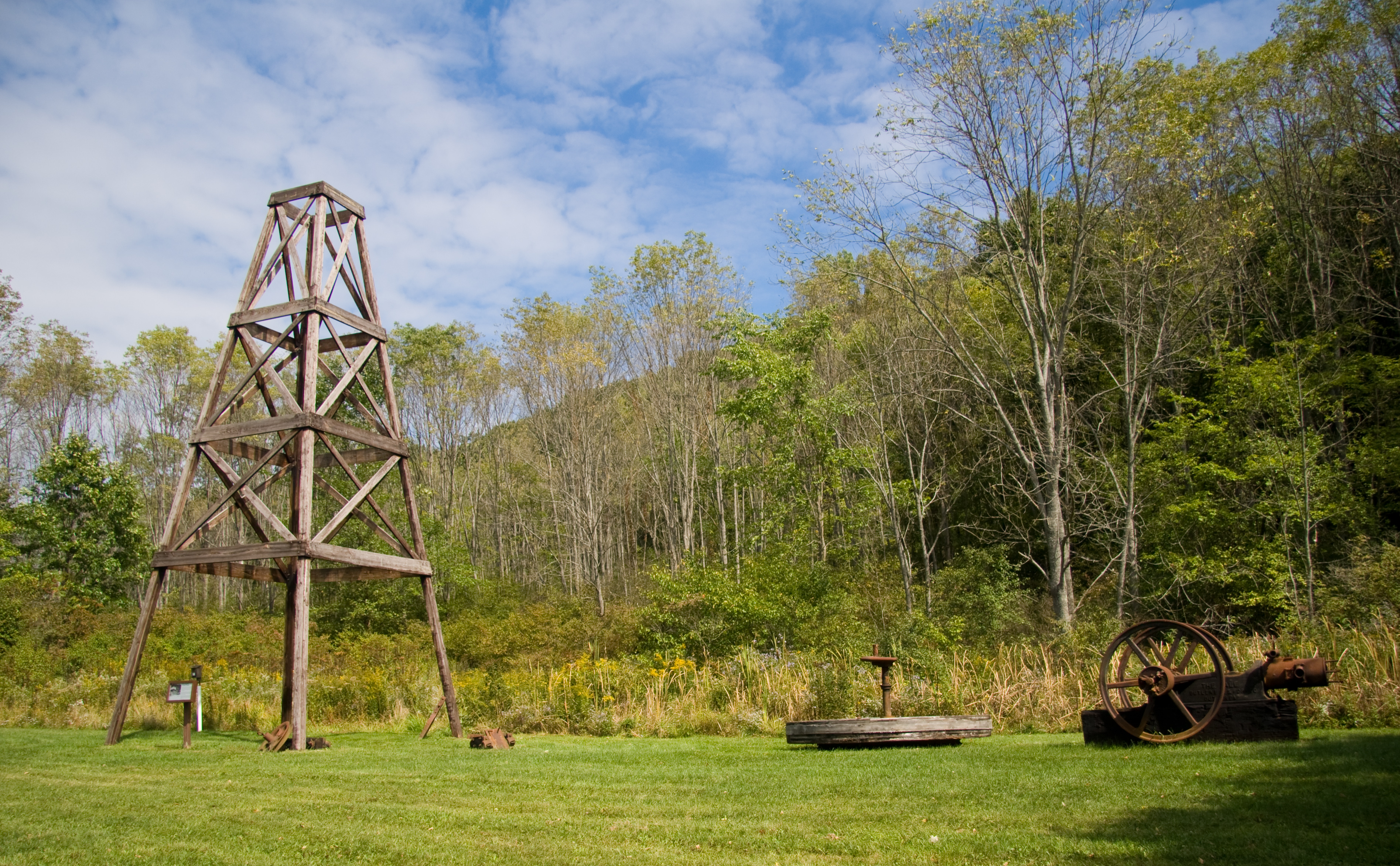
- A historic recreation of a wooden oil derrick at Oil Creek State Park

- Location within Pennsylvania Location within the United States
- Interactive map of Oil Creek State Park
- Location: Venango County, Pennsylvania, United States
- Coordinates: 41°30′56″N 79°40′51″W
- Area: 6,531.48 acres (2,643.20 ha)
- Elevation: 1,407 feet (429 m)
- Established: 1931
- Administrator: Pennsylvania Department of Conservation and Natural Resources
- Website: Official website
- Pennsylvania State Parks

Oil Creek State Park is a Pennsylvania state park on 6,250 acres (2,529 ha) in Cherrytree, Cornplanter and Oil Creek Townships, Venango County, Pennsylvania in the United States. The park is adjacent to Drake Well Museum, the site of the first successful commercial oil well in the United States, that was drilled under the direction of Colonel Edwin Drake. Oil Creek State Park follows Oil Creek, between Titusville and Oil City, and is on Pennsylvania Route 8. While the creek is the park's main recreational attraction, it also contains the sites of the first oil boomtown and much of Pennsylvania's original oil industry. The park contains a museum, tableaux, and trails to help visitors understand the history of the oil industry there, and an excursion train.

Oil Creek State Park was chosen by the Pennsylvania Department of Conservation and Natural Resources (DCNR) and its Bureau of Parks as one of "25 Must-See Pennsylvania State Parks".

== History ==
The history of Oil Creek State Park is tied to the rise and fall of the oil industry in northwestern Pennsylvania. What is now a wild second growth forest with several cold water fishery creeks flowing through it, was once the site of the vast oil industry that changed the landscape and water quality of the Oil Creek Valley. Titusville, to the north of Oil Creek State Park, was a slow-growing community, lying along the banks of Oil Creek until the 1850s. Lumber was the principal industry with at least 17 sawmills in the area.

Oil was known to exist here, but there was no practical way to extract it. Its main use to that time had been as a medicine for both animals and humans. In the late 1850s Seneca Oil Company (formerly the Pennsylvania Rock Oil Company) sent its manager, Colonel Edwin L. Drake, to start drilling on a piece of leased land just south of Titusville, near what is now Oil Creek State Park. Drake hired a salt well driller, William A. Smith, in the summer of 1859. After many difficulties, they finally drilled a commercially successful well on August 27. It was an event that changed the world, beginning with the surrounding vicinity.

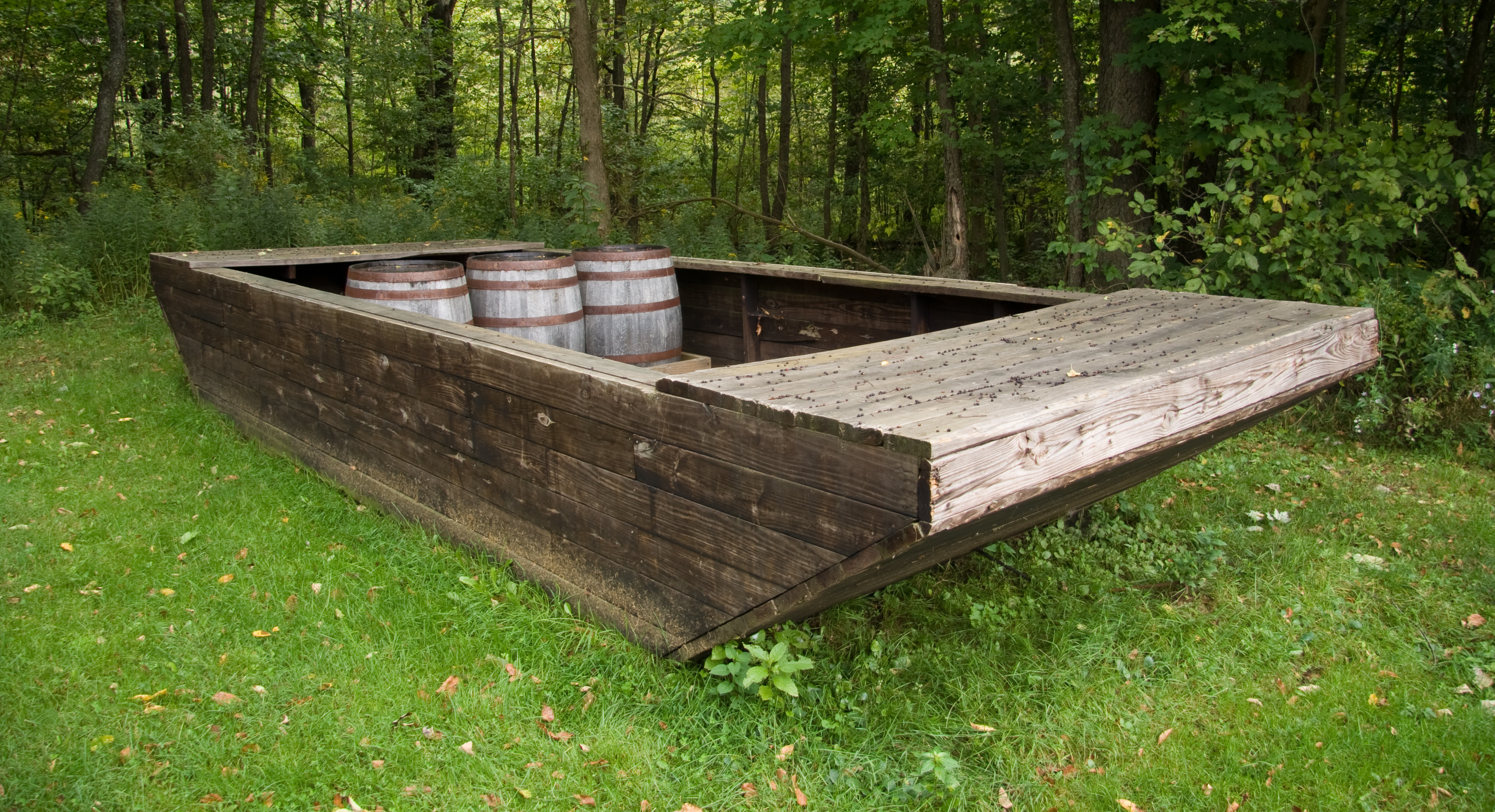
Barges like this were filled with oil barrels and floated down Oil Creek.

Teamsters were needed immediately to transport the oil to markets. Barges were filled with oil and sent down Oil Creek to Oil City on the Allegheny River. There the oil was transferred to steamships and sent on to Pittsburgh. Transportation methods improved, and in 1862 the Oil Creek and Titusville Railroad was built between Titusville and Corry, where freight was transferred to other, larger, east-west rail lines. In 1865, pipelines were laid directly next to the rail line and the demand for teamsters practically ended. The next year the railroad line was extended south to Petroleum Centre and Oil City. The Union City & Titusville Railroad was built in 1865, which became part of the Philadelphia and Erie Railroad in 1871. That fall President Ulysses S. Grant visited Titusville to view the booming oil industry.

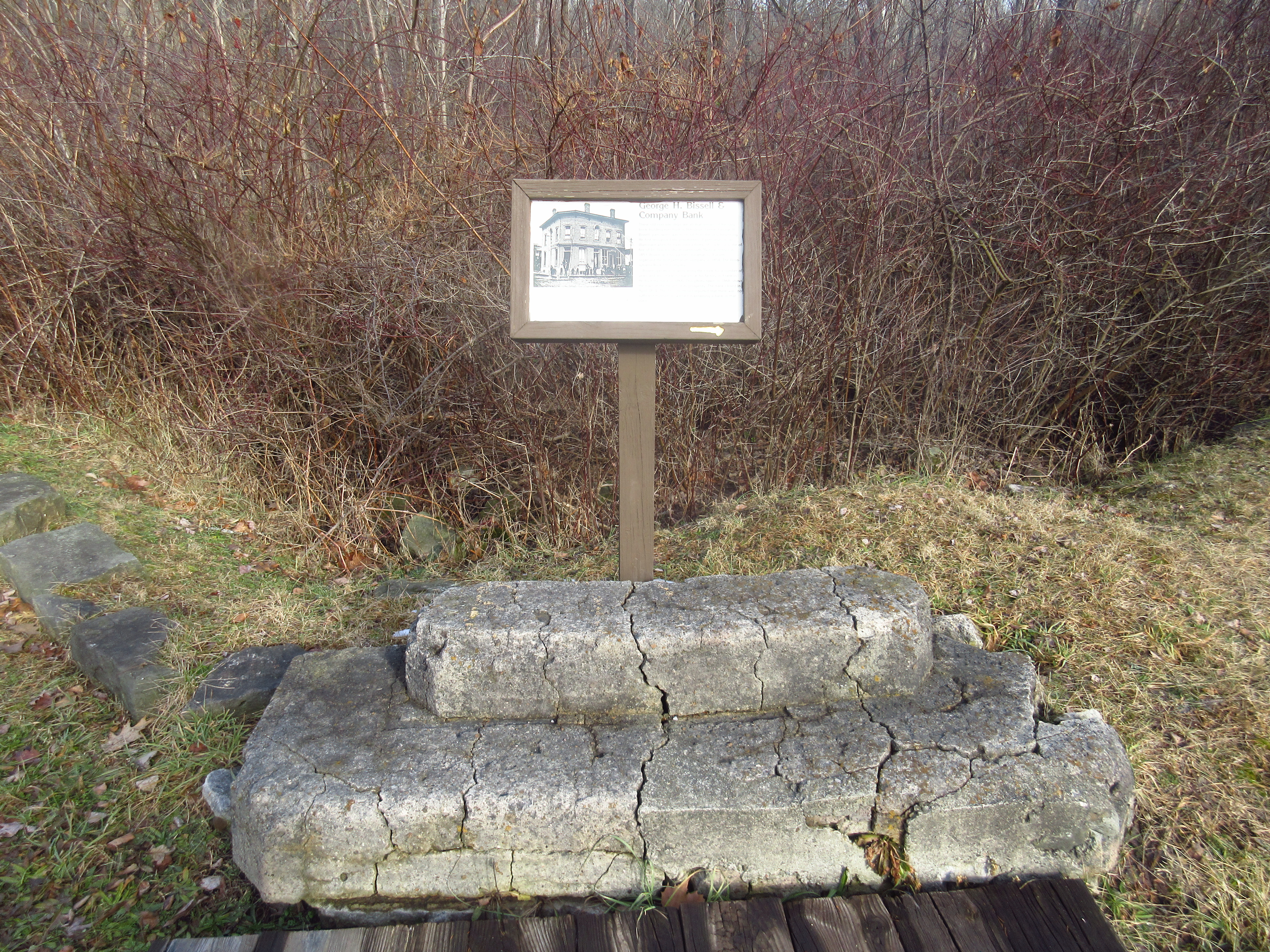
An interpretative trail guides visitors past the remnants of the former oil boomtown of Petroleum Center.

Other oil-related businesses quickly were built in the area. Eight refineries were built between 1862 and 1868. Drilling tools were needed and several iron works were built. Titusville grew from 250 residents to 10,000 almost overnight and in 1866 it incorporated as a city. The first oil millionaire, a resident of Titusville, was Jonathan Watson who owned the land where Drake's well was drilled. The same land is now part of Oil Creek State Park and the Drake Well Museum.

Fire was always a concern around oil and one of the worst fires was on June 11, 1880. What came to be known as "Black Friday" happened when almost 300,000 barrels (48,000 m^{3}) of oil burned after an oil tank was hit by lightning. The fire raged for three days until it finally was brought under control. Although the oil was valued at $2 million, there was no loss of life. Another fire occurred on June 5, 1892, when Oil Creek flooded and a tank of benzine overturned. The benzine ignited and in the ensuing explosions 60 men, women, and children died. Another lightning strike in 1894 resulted in 27,000 barrels (4,300 m^{3}) lost in a fire. Oil production peaked the late 1880s and has declined greatly since, although a few operating wells are still located in the park.

With oil declining in importance, the Oil Creek area settled into an era of slower growth, with lumber eventually returning as its major industry until the hills and valleys were clear cut. Oil Creek State Park was part of a vast effort to reclaim the forests of Pennsylvania. The young men of the Civilian Conservation Corps established by President Franklin D. Roosevelt during the Great Depression worked to clear the forest and streams of dried brush, and replant the forests. They also built state roads, bridges and state park facilities. Through the efforts of the CCC and the later years of water and forest management, Oil Creek State Park is once again a wild area with a thriving wildlife population, diverse second growth forest, and crystal clean streams.

The state does not own most of the mineral rights under the park as they were sold separately in the 19th century. In May 2009 it appealed a plan to drill three natural gas wells in the park, each 6,000 feet (1,800 m) deep. The Pennsylvania Supreme Court ruled in favor of the drilling company, saying that the DCNR could not impose drilling restrictions without compensation, despite its duty to preserve public parks.

== Geology ==
Most of the oil produced in northwestern Pennsylvania was formed in sandstone reservoir rocks at the boundary between the Mississippian and Devonian rock layers. Over time, the oil migrated toward the surface, became trapped beneath an impervious layer of caprock, and formed a reservoir. The presence of upwards-curving folds in the caprock called anticlines, or sometimes an inversion of an anticline called a syncline, greatly varied the depth of the reservoirs, from around 4,000 feet (1,200 m) to just beneath the surface.

The majority of the oil wells in the vicinity of the Oil Creek valley tapped into a sandstone formation known as the Venango Third sand. The Venango Third contained large volumes of oil under high pressure at only 450 to 550 feet (140 to 170 m) below ground level. Other oil-producing formations in the area were "the Venango First and Second [sands], the latter often prevailing after the Third sand was lost."

== Recreation ==
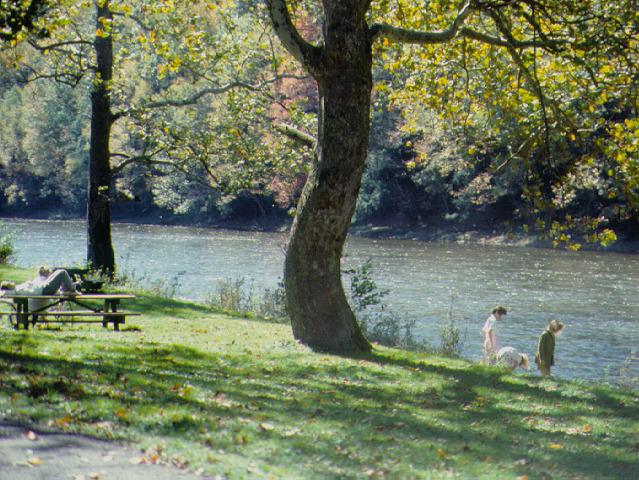
Oil Creek in the park

The park offers picnicking, canoeing, fishing, backpacking, cross-country skiing, and bicycling (the last along a paved 9.4 miles (15.1 km) rail-trail). The Oil Creek and Titusville Railroad, a diesel tourist excursion train, runs through the park from Oil City to Titusville, with stops throughout the park. The Gerard Hiking Trail forms a 36-mile loop throughout the park, and there are several additional spur and connector trails.

Oil Creek is popular with canoeists and anglers. The creek is rated as a beginners creek for those interested in learning how to safely use canoes and kayaks. Oil Creek is a cold water fishery with bass and trout living in its waters. All anglers are expected to follow the rules and regulations of the Pennsylvania Fish and Boat Commission.

There are about 6,250 acres (2,530 ha) open to hunting at Oil Creek State Park. Hunters are expected to follow the rules and regulations of the Pennsylvania Game Commission. The most common game species are eastern cottontail rabbits, ruffed grouse, eastern gray squirrels, wild turkey and white-tailed deer. The hunting of groundhogs is prohibited.

== See also ==
- The Oil Region
- Pithole, Pennsylvania
- Gerard Hiking Trail

== Sources ==
- Caplinger, Michael W (1997). "Allegheny National Forest Oil Heritage". Historic American Engineering Record. National Park Service.
- Darrah, William Culp (1972). Pithole, the vanished city. Gettysburg: William Culp Darrah. ISBN 0-913116-03-3. LCCN 72078194.
- Pees, Samuel T (Spring 1998). "Oil Creek's Riparian Wells" (PDF). Pennsylvania Geology. 29 (1). Pennsylvania Department of Conservation and Natural Resources: 14–18. Archived from the original (PDF) on April 20, 2004.
