= Oil Region National Heritage Area =

United States National Heritage Area in Pennsylvania

Coordinates: 41.43306°N 79.70756°W

Oil Region National Heritage Area is a federally designated National Heritage Area in the northwestern portion of the U.S. state of Pennsylvania. The national heritage area commemorates and promotes the region surrounding Edwin Drake's oil well of 1859 near Titusville, which gave rise to the modern oil industry.

The national heritage area includes all of Venango County and a portion of Crawford County, including Titusville and Oil Creek Township, in and around the Oil Creek valley.

The Oil Region National Heritage Area was established by Public Law 108-447 in 2004. It is administered by the Oil Region Alliance.

The Drake Well Museum and Oil Creek State Park are located in this region
