= Oil Creek and Titusville Railroad =

Overview
- Headquarters: Titusville, Pennsylvania
- Reporting mark: OCTL
- Locale: Crawford County and Venango County, Pennsylvania
- Dates of operation: July 18, 1986–
- Predecessor: Conrail

Technical
- Track gauge: 4 ft 8 1/2 in (1,435 mm) standard gauge
- Length: 16.5 miles (26.6 km)

Other
- Website: octrr.org

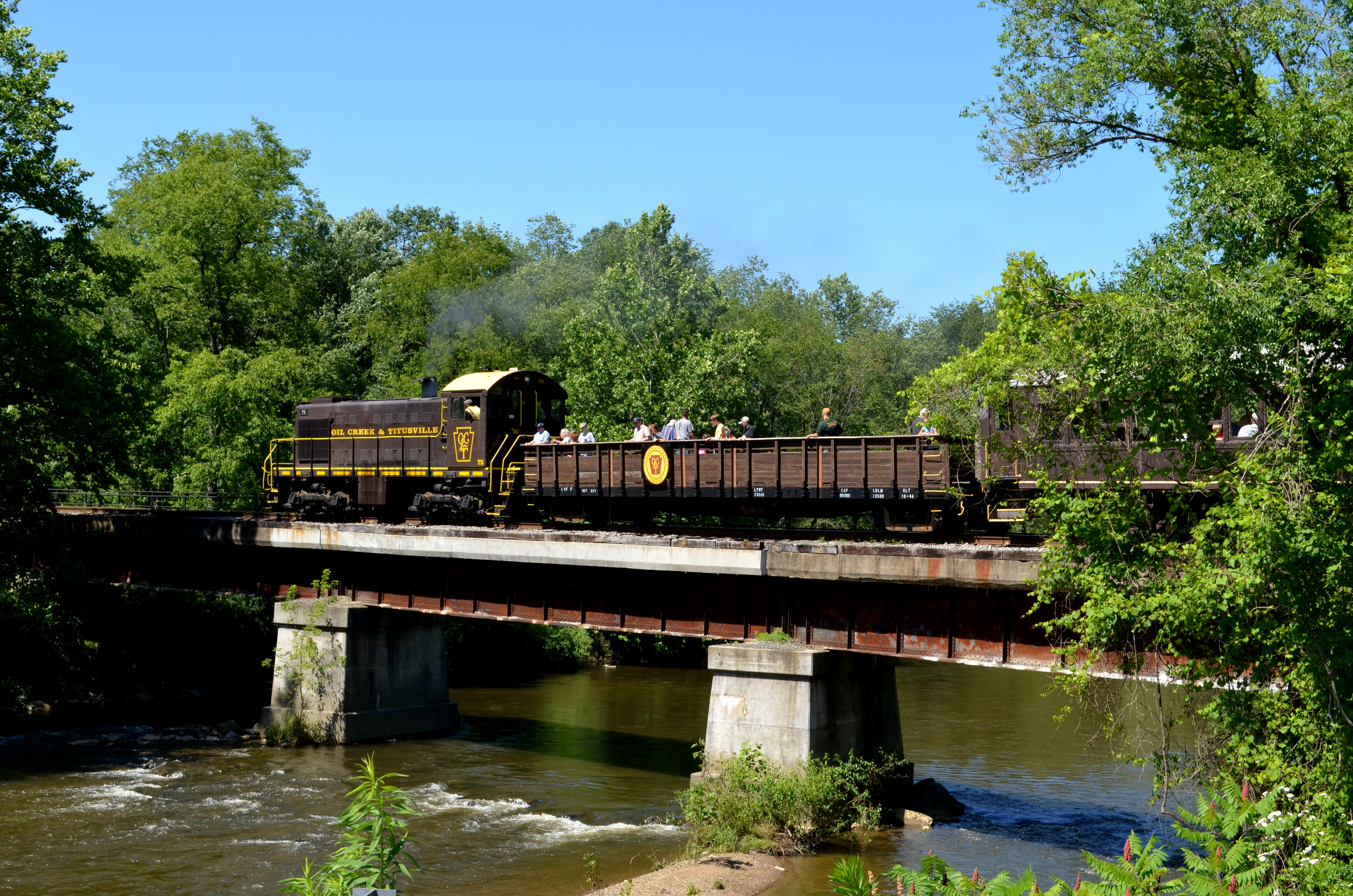
OCTL crossing Oil Creek near Drake Well

The Oil Creek and Titusville Railroad (reporting mark OCTL) is a tourist railroad that runs from Titusville to Rynd Farm north of Oil City in the U.S. state of Pennsylvania. The Oil Creek and Titusville Lines (reporting mark OCTL) is the designated operator of the railroad, as well as the freight carrier on the line.

== History ==
The Oil Creek and Titusville operates over tracks that were originally built as the main line of the Buffalo, New York and Philadelphia Railroad in the 1880s; trackage in Titusville was originally owned by the Dunkirk, Allegheny Valley and Pittsburgh Railroad. The Buffalo, New York and Philadelphia was reorganized in 1887 into the Western New York and Pennsylvania Railroad, which was eventually acquired by the Pennsylvania Railroad in 1900. The Pennsylvania was merged with the New York Central Railroad in 1968 and became Penn Central. In 1976, Penn Central went bankrupt, along with several other railroads, and was combined into Conrail.

In 1986, the line was acquired from Conrail by the Oil Creek Railway Historical Society, with the first tourist trains running on July 18; freight operations began on September 25, 1986. Briefly, from December 2, 1995 to August 1996, the Oil Creek and Titusville operated over the former Conrail main line between Meadville and Corry. The operation and ownership of that line reverted to Conrail before being turned over to the Western New York and Pennsylvania Railroad.

== Infrastructure ==
The OC&T is notable in that it operates the only working Railway Post Office in the United States. For income, it may carry a few freight cars at the end of the passenger cars. The trackage was formerly Conrail and was out of service in 1986 when it was purchased by the founders. The inaugural excursion came in July of that year. The railway travels through the Oil Creek State Park on its journey over 13.5 miles (21.7 km) of track. It hauls over 1,000 carloads of freight and 20,000 passengers each year.

== Stations ==
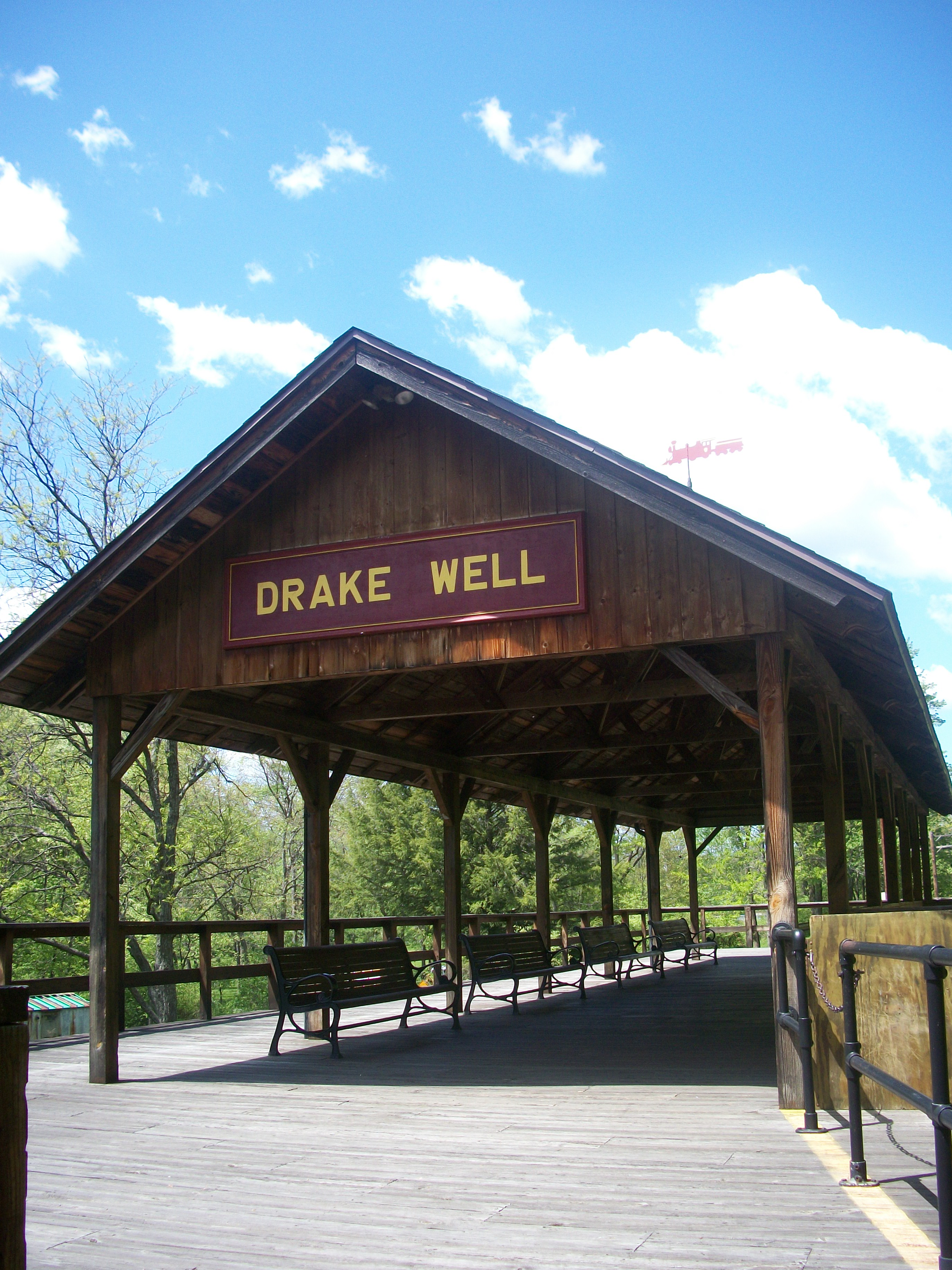
Rail station along the line.

Four stations along the line that have been used off and on to present day: Perry Street, Petroleum Centre, Rynd Farm, and Drake Well. It has seven passenger cars converted from powered units and an open-air, gondola car. It has three operating locomotives: MLW M-420 #3568, and Alco S-2's #75 and #85 (the Atlas 50T 00 is not used).

The railway also has a caboose marked O.C.T.R. 10R, plus the Caboose Motel, made up of several cabooses no longer in service.

Image	No.	Model	Builder	Built	Notes
	3568	M-420	Montreal Locomotive Works	1976	ex St. Thomas and Eastern Railway exx Canadian National Railway
	85	S-2	American Locomotive Company	1950	ex South Buffalo Railway 85
	75	S-2	American Locomotive Company	1947	ex South Buffalo Railway 75

== See also ==
- List of heritage railroads in the United States
