= Chesapeake Gateways =

Program with the US National Park Service

Chesapeake Gateways and Watertrails Network
- Location within Virginia Location within the United States
- Location: Chesapeake Bay Watershed
- Nearest city: Annapolis, Maryland
- Coordinates: 37°11′31″N 76°09′08″W
- Established: 1998
- Governing body: National Park Service

The Chesapeake Gateways and Watertrails Network is a partnership program of the National Park Service and a system of over 200 parks, refuges, museums, historic communities and water trails in the Chesapeake Bay watershed. As a partnership program, it is not considered a Unit of the National Park System but is managed by National Park Service Chesapeake Gateways in Annapolis, Maryland.

Chesapeake Gateways is a system of places providing opportunities to enjoy, learn about and help conserve the Chesapeake Bay and its watershed. Places and experiences in the greater Chesapeake Bay watershed are eligible to participate in the Network, including natural, cultural, historical, and recreational sites, trails, museums, parks, refuges, interpretive and orientation facilities, and associated programs. These places, and Chesapeake Gateways as a whole, serve as entry points and the key guide for experiencing the Chesapeake Bay watershed.

== History ==
The Chesapeake Gateways and Watertrails Network, the Chesapeake Gateways Network, was established through the authority of the Chesapeake Bay Initiative Act, which was passed by the United States Congress in 1998.

Implementation of the Chesapeake Bay Initiative Act began in 1999. The original Framework outlined the goals, geography, and structure of Chesapeake Gateways, setting out interpretive themes and identifying early initiatives. The first Chesapeake Gateways Places were recognized that same month. Over the next several years, Chesapeake Gateways grew rapidly to include over 160 recognized Chesapeake Gateways Places by 2005.

Chesapeake Gateways Places came together in regional workshops and annual partner meetings. A comprehensive website was launched, providing visitor information on all Chesapeake Gateways Places. A brochure was widely distributed, and various thematic interpretive products were developed. NPS Chesapeake Gateways provided members with technical and financial assistance, helping support partner work from interpretive planning to exhibits and signage to water trail development and public access site construction.

The NPS supports the Chesapeake Gateways Network through two formal annual assistance offerings. Chesapeake Gateways Grants are competitive financial assistance opportunities normally open for application in late summer, early fall each year. Through this annual opportunity, the NPS provides approximately $1 million in financial assistance. In addition, the NPS provides an annual technical assistance program. Through this offering, the NPS serves as a collaborative partner, providing professional services to help Chesapeake Gateways Places and Partners achieve their vision.

The Captain John Smith Chesapeake National Historic Trail and the Star-Spangled Banner National Historic Trail were managed through the Chesapeake Gateways from their establishment through 2018-2019 when they were moved to Colonial National Historical Park and Fort McHenry National Monument and Historic Shrine respectively.

Between 2020-2024, the Chesapeake Gateways Network went through a comprehensive refresh to better address partner needs and provide the full benefit of the National Park Service's resources to the network. This refresh resulted in the Chesapeake Gateways Framework published in 2025.
